

Deaths in January

 29 Tom Brookshier
 27 Ruben Kruger
 19 Bill McLaren
 10 Bill Patterson

Current sporting seasons

American football 2009

NFL
NCAA Division I FBS

Auto racing 2010

GP2 Asia Series

Rolex Sports Car Series

Basketball 2009

NBA
NCAA Division I men
NCAA Division I women
Euroleague
Eurocup
EuroChallenge
ASEAN Basketball League
Australia
France
Germany
Greece
Iran
Israel
Italy
Philippines
Philippine Cup
Russia
Spain
Turkey

Cricket 2009–2010

Australia:
Sheffield Shield
Ford Ranger Cup

Bangladesh:
National League

India:
Ranji Trophy

New Zealand:
Plunket Shield
Pakistan:
Quaid-i-Azam Trophy
South Africa:
SuperSport Series
Sri Lanka:
Premier Trophy

Zimbabwe:
Logan Cup

Football (soccer) 2009

National teams competitions
African Cup of Nations
2011 FIFA Women's World Cup qualification (UEFA)
2011 AFC Asian Cup qualification

International clubs competitions
UEFA (Europe) Champions League
Europa League
UEFA Women's Champions League
Copa Libertadores (South America)

AFC (Asia) Champions League

CONCACAF (North & Central America) Champions League
OFC (Oceania) Champions League
Domestic (national) competitions

Australia

England
France
Germany
Iran
Italy

Scotland
Spain

Golf 2010

PGA Tour
European Tour

Ice hockey 2009

National Hockey League

Rugby union 2009

Heineken Cup
European Challenge Cup
English Premiership
Celtic League
LV Cup
Top 14

Winter sports

Alpine Skiing World Cup
Biathlon World Cup

Cross-Country Skiing World Cup

Freestyle Skiing World Cup

Nordic Combined World Cup

Ski Jumping World Cup
Snowboard World Cup
Speed Skating World Cup

Days of the month

January 31, 2010 (Sunday)

Alpine skiing
Women's World Cup in St. Moritz, Switzerland:
Super-G: (1) Lindsey Vonn  (2) Andrea Fischbacher , Marie Marchand-Arvier 
Men's World Cup in Kranjska Gora, Slovenia:
Slalom: (1) Reinfried Herbst  (2) Marcel Hirscher  (3) Julien Lizeroux

American football
NFL: Pro Bowl at Miami Gardens, Florida:
AFC All-Stars 41, NFC All-Stars  34.
Houston Texans quarterback Matt Schaub is the game's MVP.

Automobile Racing
The 24 Hours of Daytona comes to a close, with Action Express Racing winning in a Porsche in the DP class and SpeedSource winning in a Mazda RX-8 in the GT class.

Bandy
Men's World Championship in Moscow, Russia:
3rd place game:   4–3 
Final:   5–6 (2OT)  
Sweden win the title for the second straight time and tenth overall.

Cricket
Pakistan in Australia:
5th ODI in Perth:
 212 (49.3 overs);  213/8 (49.2 overs). Australia win by 2 wickets, win the 5-match series 5–0.
Associates Twenty20 Series in Kenya:
 109/8 (20/20 ov);  109 (20/20 ov) in Nairobi. Match tied (Scotland win the one-over eliminator).

Darts
Players Championship Finals in Purfleet, England:
Final: Paul Nicholson  def. Mervyn King  13–11

Football (soccer)
African Cup of Nations in Angola:
Final:   0–1  
Mohamed Nagy's goal in the 85th minute gives Egypt their third successive title and seventh overall.
AFC Champions League qualifying play-off, Semi-final Round:
Đà Nẵng  0–3  Muang Thong United

Golf
PGA Tour:
Farmers Insurance Open in La Jolla, California:
 Winner: Ben Crane  275 (−13)
 Crane wins his first PGA Tour title since 2005 and his third overall.
 News:
 John Daly backs away from his retirement announcement of the previous day, telling the director of the AT&T Pebble Beach National Pro-Am that he plans to play in that event in two weeks' time. (ESPN)
European Tour:
The Commercialbank Qatar Masters in Qatar:
 Winner: Robert Karlsson  273 (−15)
 Karlsson returns from an eye injury last season to win his 10th European Tour title.
Champions Tour:
Mitsubishi Electric Championship at Hualalai in Kaupulehu-Kona, Hawaii
Winner: Tom Watson  194 (−22)
The limited-field opening event of the Champions Tour season sees Watson earn his 13th victory on that tour.

Handball
European Men's Championship in Austria:
Bronze medal game:  26–29  
Final:   21–25  
France win the European title for the second time and complete a treble of Olympic, World and European titles.

Luge
World Cup in Cesana, Italy:
Women:

Nordic combined
World Cup in Seefeld, Austria:
HS100 / 10 km:

Ski jumping
World Cup in Oberstdorf, Germany:
HS 213 (Ski flying):

Snooker
Welsh Open in Newport, Wales:
Final: John Higgins  (2) def. Ali Carter  (1) 9–4

Tennis
Australian Open in Melbourne, Australia, day 14:
Men's Singles Final:
Roger Federer  [1] def. Andy Murray  [5] 6–3, 6–4, 7–6(11)
Federer wins his fourth Australian Open title and extends his record of Grand Slam titles to 16.
Mixed Doubles Final:
Cara Black /Leander Paes  [1] def. Ekaterina Makarova /Jaroslav Levinský  7–5, 6–3
Black and Paes win their second Grand Slam title together. Paes wins his 11th Grand Slam title and gets level with fellow Indian Mahesh Bhupathi. Black wins her ninth Grand Slam title and completes a career Grand Slam in mixed doubles.

January 30, 2010 (Saturday)

Alpine skiing
Women's World Cup in St. Moritz, Switzerland:
Downhill:
Men's World Cup in Kranjska Gora, Slovenia:
Giant slalom:

Bandy
Men's World Championship in Moscow, Russia:
Group B 4th place game:  5–5 (1–2 pen.) 
Group B 2nd place game:  7–4 
Qualification game:  9–6 
USA will remain in Group A and Canada in Group B.
Semifinals:
 9–4 
 16–3

Cricket
U-19 World Cup Final in Lincoln, New Zealand:
 207/9 (50 overs);  182 (46.4 overs). Australia win by 25 runs.
Associates Twenty20 Series in Kenya:
 123/9 (20/20 ov);  127/2 (17.2/20 ov) in Nairobi. Kenya win by 8 wickets.

Figure skating
Four Continents Championships in Jeonju, South Korea:
Men:  Adam Rippon  225.78  Tatsuki Machida  217.48  Kevin Reynolds  212.99

Football (soccer)
African Cup of Nations in Angola:
3rd Place:   1–0 
AFC Champions League qualifying play-off, Semi-final Round:
Singapore Armed Forces  3–0  Sriwijaya
Al-Karamah  0–1  Al-Wahda

Freestyle skiing
World Cup in Mont Gabriel, Canada:
Men's aerials:
Women's aerials:

Futsal
European Championship in Hungary:
Third place play-off:  3–5  
Final:   2–4  
Spain win the title for the third straight time and fifth overall.

Handball
European Men's Championship in Austria:
5th/6th place:  34–27 
Semifinals:
 24–21 
 28–36

Luge
World Cup in Cesana, Italy:
Men:
Doubles:

Nordic combined
World Cup in Seefeld, Austria:
HS100 / 10 km:

Ski jumping
World Cup in Oberstdorf, Germany:
HS 213 Team (Ski flying):

Snowboarding
World Cup in Calgary, Canada:
Men's half-pipe:
Women's half-pipe:
Men's slopestyle:
Women's slopestyle:

Tennis
Australian Open in Melbourne, Australia, day 13:
Women's Singles Final:
Serena Williams  [1] def. Justine Henin  [WC] 6–4, 3–6, 6–2
Williams wins her fifth Australian Open and 12th Grand Slam singles title.
Men's Doubles Final:
Bob Bryan /Mike Bryan  [1] def. Daniel Nestor /Nenad Zimonjić  [2] 6–3, 6–7(5), 6–3
Bob and Mike Bryan win their fourth Australian Open in five years and eighth Grand Slam men's doubles title.

January 29, 2010 (Friday)

Alpine skiing
Women's World Cup in St. Moritz, Switzerland:
Super combined:  Anja Pärson  2:00.54  Michaela Kirchgasser  2:00.97  Lindsey Vonn  2:01.46
Men's World Cup in Kranjska Gora, Slovenia:
Giant slalom:  Ted Ligety  2:22.02  Marcel Hirscher  2:22.36  Kjetil Jansrud  2:22.53

Cricket
Pakistan in Australia:
4th ODI in Perth:
 277/8 (50 overs);  142 (37.5 overs). Australia win by 135 runs, lead the 5-match series 4–0.

Figure skating
Four Continents Championships in Jeonju, South Korea:
Ladies:  Mao Asada  183.96  Akiko Suzuki  173.72  Caroline Zhang  160.78
Ice Dance:  Kaitlyn Weaver/Andrew Poje  166.16  Allie Hann-McCurdy/Michael Coreno  159.56 (3) Madison Hubbell/Keiffer Hubbell  154.20

Golf
After missing the cut at the Farmers Insurance Open, two-time major winner John Daly announced his retirement.

Tennis
Australian Open in Melbourne, Australia, day 12:
Men's Singles – Semifinals:
Roger Federer  [1] def. Jo-Wilfried Tsonga  [10] 6–2, 6–3, 6–2
Women's Doubles – Final:
Serena Williams /Venus Williams  [2] def. Cara Black /Liezel Huber  [1] 6–4, 6–3
The Williams sisters win their 4th Australian Open and 11th Grand Slam doubles title.

January 28, 2010 (Thursday)

Bandy
Men's World Championship in Moscow, Russia: (teams in bold advance to the semifinals)
Group A:
 4–9 
 5–9 
 7–4 
Final standings: Russia 10 points, Sweden 8, Finland 6, Kazakhstan 4, Norway 2, USA 0.
Group B:
 4–3 
 7–6 
Final standings: Canada 8 points, Latvia, Netherlands 5, Mongolia, Hungary 1.
Canada advance to the qualification game.

Basketball
Euroleague Top 16, matchday 1:
Group E: Regal FC Barcelona  79–69  Maroussi Athens
Group F: Montepaschi Siena  76–72  Maccabi Tel Aviv
Group G: Asseco Prokom Gdynia  89–65  Žalgiris Kaunas
Group H:
Khimki Moscow Region  83–70  Cibona Zagreb
Caja Laboral Baskonia  85–89  Olympiacos Piraeus

Cricket
ICC Intercontinental Cup in Nairobi:
 91 and 323;  306 and 110/2. Scotland win by 8 wickets.
Standings: Scotland 49 points (3 matches),  43 (3),  XI 23 (2), Kenya 23 (4),  15 (2),  12 (3),  3 (3).

Figure skating
Four Continents Championships in Jeonju, South Korea:
Ice Dance – standings after Original Dance: (1) Kaitlyn Weaver/Andrew Poje  81.09 (2) Allie Hann-McCurdy/Michael Coreno  78.10 (3) Huang Xintong/Zheng Xun  77.33
Pairs:  Zhang Dan/Zhang Hao  192.22  Keauna McLaughlin/Rockne Brubaker  170.17  Meagan Duhamel/Craig Buntin  158.02
Men – Short Program: (1) Kevin Reynolds  81.60 (2) Song Nan  72.95 (3) Brandon Mroz  70.88

Football (soccer)
African Cup of Nations in Angola:
Semifinals:
 1–0 
 0–4 
Copa Libertadores First Stage, first leg:
Junior  2–2  Racing

Futsal
European Championship in Hungary:
Semifinals:
 3–3 (3–5 pen.) 
 1–8

Handball
European Men's Championship in Austria: (teams in bold advance to the semifinals)
Group I in Vienna:
 34–35 
 30–31 
 27–23 
Final standings: Croatia 9 points, Iceland 8, Denmark 6, Norway 4, Austria 3, Russia 0.
Group II in Innsbruck:
 26–26 
 32–40 
 24–29 
Final standings: France 9 points, Poland, Spain 7, Czech Republic 3, Germany, Slovenia 2.

Tennis
Australian Open in Melbourne, Australia, day 11:
Women's Singles – Semifinals:
Serena Williams  [1] def. Li Na  [16] 7–6(4), 7–6(1)
Justine Henin  def. Zheng Jie  6–1, 6–0
Men's Singles – Semifinals:
Andy Murray  [4] def. Marin Čilić  [14] 3–6, 6–4, 6–4, 6–2

January 27, 2010 (Wednesday)

Bandy
Men's World Championship in Moscow, Russia: (teams in bold advance to the semifinals)
Group A:
 13–2 
 6–5 
 19–5 
Standings (after 4 games): Russia, Sweden 8 points, Finland 4, Norway, Kazakhstan 2, USA 0.
Group B:
 15–1 
 1–7 
Standings: Canada 8 points (4 games), Latvia, Netherlands 3 (3), Mongolia, Hungary 1 (3).
Canada advance to the qualification game.

Basketball
Euroleague Top 16, matchday 1:
Group E: Panathinaikos Athens  59–64  Partizan Belgrade
Group F: Real Madrid  77–70  Efes Pilsen Istanbul
Group G: CSKA Moscow  86–78  Unicaja Málaga

Cricket
India in Bangladesh:
2nd Test in Mirpur, day 4:
 233 and 312;  544/8d and 2/0. India win by 10 wickets, win the 2-match series 2–0.

Figure skating
Four Continents Championships in Jeonju, South Korea:
Ice Dance – Compulsory Dance: (1) Kaitlyn Weaver/Andrew Poje  32.67 (2) Huang Xintong/Zheng Xun  30.12 (3) Allie Hann-McCurdy/Michael Coreno  29.89
Pairs – Short Program: (1) Zhang Dan/Zhang Hao  65.86 (2) Keauna McLaughlin/Rockne Brubaker  64.56 (3) Meagan Duhamel/Craig Buntin  56.90
Ladies – Short Program: (1) Akiko Suzuki  58.88 (2) Amanda Dobbs  57.56 (3) Mao Asada  57.22

Football (soccer)
Copa Libertadores First Stage, first leg:
Juan Aurich  2–0  Estudiantes Tecos
Real Potosí  1–1  Cruzeiro
Newell's Old Boys  0–0  Emelec

Tennis
Australian Open in Melbourne, Australia, day 10:
Men's Singles – Quarterfinals:
Roger Federer  [1] def. Nikolay Davydenko  [6] 2–6, 6–3, 6–0, 7–5
Jo-Wilfried Tsonga  [10] def. Novak Djokovic  [3] 7–6(8), 6–7(5), 1–6, 6–3, 6–1
Women's Singles – Quarterfinals:
Serena Williams  [1] def. Victoria Azarenka  [7] 4–6, 7–6(4), 6–2
Li Na  [16] def. Venus Williams  [6] 2–6, 7–6(4), 7–5

January 26, 2010 (Tuesday)

Alpine skiing
Men's World Cup in Schladming, Austria:
Slalom:  Reinfried Herbst  1:45.91  Silvan Zurbriggen  1:46.47  Manfred Pranger  1:46.73
Slalom standings (after 7 of 9 events): (1) Herbst 405 (2) Julien Lizeroux  402 (3) Ivica Kostelic  302
Overall standings (after 25 of 34 events): (1) Benjamin Raich  903 (2) Carlo Janka  829 (3) Didier Cuche  746

Bandy
Men's World Championship in Moscow, Russia: (teams in bold advance to the semifinals)
Group A:
 13–2 
 0–12 
 12–2 
Standings (after 3 games): Russia, Sweden 6 points, Finland, Norway, Kazakhstan 2, USA 0.
Group B:
 2–18 
 5–5 (3–2 pen.) 
Standings: Canada 6 points (3 games), Netherlands 3 (3), Hungary, Latvia, Mongolia 1 (2).
Canada advance to the qualification game.

Basketball
ULEB Eurocup Last 16, matchday 1:
Group I:
Le Mans  63–68  ALBA Berlin
DKV Joventut  74–72  Aris BSA 2003
Group J:
Galatasaray Café Crown  79–85  UNICS Kazan
Power Elec Valencia  75–79  Hapoel Jerusalem
Group K:
Panellinios BC  70–62  Brose Baskets
Benetton Basket  69–76  Bizkaia Bilbao Basket
Group L:
ČEZ Nymburk  60–65  Crvena zvezda
Gran Canaria 2014  73–65  Türk Telekom

Cricket
India in Bangladesh:
2nd Test in Mirpur, day 3:
 233 and 228/1 (Tamim Iqbal 151);  544/8d. Bangladesh trail by 83 runs with 9 wickets remaining.
Pakistan in Australia:
3rd ODI in Adelaide:
 286/6 (50 overs);  246 (47.4 overs). Australia win by 40 runs, lead the 5-match series 3–0.

Football (soccer)
Copa Libertadores First Stage, first leg:
Deportivo Táchira  1–0  Libertad
Colón  3–2  Universidad Católica
 Toto Cup Final in Ramat Gan:
Hapoel Ra'anana 0–1 Beitar Jerusalem

Futsal
European Championship in Hungary:
Quarterfinals:
 0–0 (6–7 pen.) 
 1–5

Handball
European Men's Championship in Austria: (teams in bold advance to the semifinals)
Group I in Vienna:
 30–38 
 26–23 
 23–24 
Standings (after 4 games): Croatia 7 points, Iceland, Denmark 6, Norway 4, Austria 1, Russia 0.
Group II in Innsbruck:
 28–37 
 20–25 
 35–34 
Standings (after 4 games): France, Poland 7 points, Spain 5, Slovenia, Czech Republic 2, Germany 1.

Tennis
Australian Open in Melbourne, Australia, day 9:
Men's Singles – Quarterfinals:
Andy Murray  [5] def. Rafael Nadal  [2] 6–3, 7–6(4), 3–0, ret.
Marin Čilić  [14] def. Andy Roddick  [7] 7–6(4), 6–3, 3–6, 2–6, 6–3
Women's Singles – Quarterfinals:
Justine Henin  def. Nadia Petrova  [19] 7–6(3), 7–5
Zheng Jie  def. Maria Kirilenko  6–1, 6–3

January 25, 2010 (Monday)

Bandy
Men's World Championship in Moscow, Russia:
Group A:
 3–12 
 14–6 
 4–12 
Group B:
 1–17 
 5–5 (2–3 pen.)

Cricket
India in Bangladesh:
2nd Test in Mirpur, day 2:
 233;  459/5 (Sachin Tendulkar 143, Rahul Dravid 111 retd hurt). India lead  by 226 runs with 5 wickets remaining in the 1st innings.
Tendulkar scores his 45th Test century and Dravid his 29th, and they combine for their fourth double-century partnership.

Football (soccer)
African Cup of Nations in Angola:
Quarterfinals:
 3–1 (ET) 
Ahmed Hassan scores two goals for Egypt and one own goal on his 170th cap.
 0–0 (4–5 pen.)

Futsal
European Championship in Hungary:
Quarterfinals:
 3–3 (3–1 pen.) 
 3–3 (4–2 pen.)

Golf
PGA Tour:
Bob Hope Classic in Palm Desert, California:
 Winner: Bill Haas  330 (−30)
 Haas collects his first PGA Tour win in an event that his father Jay Haas won in 1988.

Handball
European Men's Championship in Austria:
Group I in Vienna:
 26–26 
 30–27 
 28–34 
Standings (after 3 games): Croatia 5 points, Iceland, Denmark, Norway 4, Austria 1, Russia 0.

Tennis
Australian Open in Melbourne, Australia, day 8:
Men's Singles – 4th Round:
Roger Federer  [1] def. Lleyton Hewitt  [22] 6–2 6–3 6–4
Novak Djokovic  [3] def. Łukasz Kubot  6–1 6–2 7–5
Nikolay Davydenko  [6] def. Fernando Verdasco  [9] 6–2 7–5 4–6 6–7(5) 6–3
Jo-Wilfried Tsonga  [10] def. Nicolás Almagro  [26] 6–3 6–4 4–6 6–7(6) 9–7
Women's Singles – 4th Round:
Serena Williams  [1] def. Samantha Stosur  [13] 6–4 6–2
Li Na  [16] def. Caroline Wozniacki  [4] 6–4 6–3
Venus Williams  [6] def. Francesca Schiavone  [17] 3–6 6–2 6–1
Victoria Azarenka  [7] def. Vera Zvonareva  [9] 4–6 6–4 6–0

January 24, 2010 (Sunday)

Alpine skiing
Men's World Cup in Kitzbühel, Austria:
Slalom:  Felix Neureuther  1:37.35  Julien Lizeroux  1:37.74  Giuliano Razzoli  1:38.34
Combined:  Ivica Kostelić  3:33.64  Silvan Zurbriggen  3:35.86  Benjamin Raich  3:36.05
Women's World Cup in Cortina, Italy:
Giant slalom:  Tanja Poutiainen  2:26.51  Viktoria Rebensburg  2:27.56  Kathrin Hölzl  2:27.96

American football
NFL Conference Championships:
AFC Championship Game: (1) Indianapolis Colts 30, (5) New York Jets 17
 The Jets take a 17–6 lead in the second quarter before Peyton Manning throws three touchdown passes against the league's number one defense.  This will be the Colts' fourth trip to the Super Bowl, all in Miami.
NFC Championship Game: (1) New Orleans Saints 31, (2) Minnesota Vikings 28 (OT)
 In the first NFC Championship game ever played at the Superdome, Garrett Hartley's 40-yard field goal in overtime sends the Saints to their first ever Super Bowl.  The Vikings commit five turnovers.

Badminton
BWF Super Series:
Malaysia Super Series:

Bandy
Men's World Championship in Moscow, Russia:
Group A:
 14–2 
 8–1 
 5–10 
Group B:
 5–4 
 15–2

Biathlon
World Cup 6 in Antholz-Anterselva, Italy:
10 km Pursuit Women:  Andrea Henkel  30:59.8 (1 penalty loop)  Magdalena Neuner  31:23.1 (4)  Ann Kristin Flatland  31:44.7 (1)
Overall standings (14 of 25 events): (1) Helena Jonsson  536 points (2) Henkel 465 (3) Simone Hauswald  452
Pursuit standings (3 of 6 events): (1) Henkel 129 points (2) Svetlana Sleptsova  126 (3) Neuner 121
12.5 km Pursuit Men:  Daniel Mesotitsch  31:50.4 (1 penalty loop)  Arnd Peiffer  31:52.1 (1)  Dominik Landertinger  32:10.1 (3)
Overall standings (14 of 25 events): (1) Simon Fourcade  429 points (2) Evgeny Ustyugov  414 (3) Christoph Sumann  404
Pursuit standings (3 of 6 events): (1) Simon Eder  125 points (2) Landertinger 112 (3) Peiffer 108

Cricket
India in Bangladesh:
2nd Test in Mirpur, day 1:
 233;  69/0. India trail by 164 runs with 10 wickets remaining in the 1st innings.
Pakistan in Australia:
2nd ODI in Sydney:
 267/6 (50 overs);  127 (37.3 overs). Australia win by 140 runs, lead the 5-match series 2–0.
ICC Intercontinental Cup in Dambulla, Sri Lanka:
 405 and 202;  474 and 137/3. Afghanistan win by 7 wickets.
Standings: Afghanistan 43 points (3 matches),  29 (2),  XI 23 (2),  23 (3),  15 (2), Ireland 12 (3),  3 (3).

Cross-country skiing
World Cup in Rybinsk, Russia:
Women's Team Sprint Freestyle:  Germany (Stefanie Böhler, Evi Sachenbacher-Stehle)  Slovenia (Katja Visnar, Vesna Fabjan)  Russia (Irina Khazova, Olga Rocheva)
Men's Team Sprint Freestyle:  Russia (Nikolay Morilov, Alexey Petukhov)  Italy (Fabio Pasini, Loris Frasnelli)  Germany (Tim Tscharnke, Josef Wenzl)

Cycling
UCI ProTour:
Tour Down Under in Australia:
Stage 6 – Adelaide, :
General classification :

Football (soccer)
African Cup of Nations in Angola:
Quarterfinals:
 0–1 
 2–3 (ET) 
Madjid Bougherra scores in injury time to level the score at 2–2, and Hameur Bouazza's goal 2 minutes into extra time puts Algeria in the semifinals for the first time in 20 years.

Freestyle skiing
World Cup in Lake Placid, United States:
Men's skicross:  Christopher Del Bosco   Andreas Matt   David Duncan 
Skicross standings (after 7 of 12 events): (1) Michael Schmid  435 (2) Matt 306 (3) Del Bosco 297
Women's skicross:  Kelsey Serwa   Fanny Smith   Ophélie David 
Skicross standings (after 7 of 12 events): (1) David 475 (2) Ashleigh McIvor  437 (3) Serwa 292

Futsal
European Championship in Hungary: (teams in bold advance to the quarterfinals)
Group C:  4–3 
Final standings: Serbia 6 points, Russia 3, Slovenia 0.
Group D:  1–6 
Final standings: Spain 6 points, Portugal, Belarus 1.

Golf
PGA Tour:
Bob Hope Classic in Palm Desert, California:
Heavy rain on Thursday washed out that day's play. The last of five scheduled rounds will be played on Monday.
European Tour:
Abu Dhabi Golf Championship in United Arab Emirates:
Winner: Martin Kaymer  267 (−21)
Kaymer returns to the site of his first European Tour win, in this event in 2008, and wins his fifth career title.

Handball
European Men's Championship in Austria:
Group II in Innsbruck:
 22–24 
 32–26 
 35–37 
Standings (after 3 games): Poland, France 5 points, Spain 3, Czech Republic, Slovenia 2, Germany 1.

Luge
European Championships in Sigulda, Latvia:
Men:  Albert Demtschenko  1:36.748  Wolfgang Kindl  1:36.974  Daniel Pfister  1:37.062
Teams:  Latvia (Anna Orlova, Martins Rubenis, Andris Sics/Juris Sics) 2:16.992  Austria (Veronika Halder, Wolfgang Kindl, Andreas Linger/Wolfgang Linger) 2:17.022  Germany (Corinna Martini, Johannes Ludwig, Tobias Wendl/Tobias Arlt) 2:17.076

Nordic combined
World Cup in Schonach, Germany:
HS96 / 4 x 5 km team:  Germany (Georg Hettich, Eric Frenzel, Björn Kircheisen, Tino Edelmann) 42:49.4  France (Sébastien Lacroix, Maxime Laheurte, Jonathan Felisaz, Jason Lamy-Chappuis) 43:37.7  Austria (Lukas Klapfer, Wilhelm Denifl, Marco Pichlmayer, Tobias Kammerlander) 43:50.5

Rugby union
Heineken Cup pool stage, matchday 6: (teams in bold advance to the quarterfinals; teams in italics parachute into the Amlin Challenge Cup)
Pool 2:
Biarritz  41–20  Glasgow Warriors
Newport Gwent Dragons  23–32  Gloucester
 Final standings: Biarritz 23 points, Gloucester 17, Glasgow Warriors 9, Dragons 6.
Pool 5:
Harlequins  20–45  Cardiff Blues
Sale Sharks  13–19  Toulouse
 Final standings: Toulouse 23 points, Cardiff Blues 18, Sale Sharks 14, Harlequins 2.
 Quarterfinal matchups:
 Munster  –  Northampton Saints
 Biarritz  –  Ospreys
 Toulouse  –  Stade Français
 Leinster  –  Clermont
Amlin Challenge Cup pool stage, matchday 6: (teams in bold advance to the quarterfinals)
Pool 1: Leeds Carnegie  9–18  Bourgoin
 Final standings: Bourgoin 23 points, Leeds 19, Overmach Parma 8, București Oaks 7.
 Quarterfinal matchups:
 Connacht  –  Bourgoin
 Toulon  –  Scarlets
 London Wasps  –  Gloucester
 Newcastle Falcons  –  Cardiff Blues

Short track speed skating
European Championships in Dresden, Germany:

Snowboarding
World Cup in Stoneham, Canada:
Men's parallel giant slalom:  Benjamin Karl   Andreas Prommegger   Jasey-Jay Anderson 
Standings (after 6 of 9 events): (1) Karl 4260 points (2) Anderson 3800 (3) Prommegger 3280
Women's parallel giant slalom:  Svetlana Boldykova   Alena Zavarzina   Nathalie Desmares 
Standings (after 6 of 9 events): (1) Fraenzi Maegert-Kohli  3020 (2) Nicolien Sauerbreij  2980 (3) Zavarzina 2666

Ten-pin bowling
 Kelly Kulick becomes the first woman to win an event against men on the PBA Tour, defeating Chris Barnes 265–195 to win the Tournament of Champions.

Tennis
Australian Open in Melbourne, Australia, day 7:
Men's Singles – 4th Round:
Rafael Nadal  [2] def. Ivo Karlović  6–4 4–6 6–4 6–4
Marin Čilić  [14] def. Juan Martín del Potro  [4] 5–7 6–4 7–5 5–7 6–3
Andy Murray  [5] def. John Isner  [33] 7–6(4) 6–3 6–2
Andy Roddick  [7] def. Fernando González  [11] 6–3 3–6 4–6 7–5 6–2
Women's Singles – 4th Round:
Maria Kirilenko  def. Dinara Safina  [2] 5–4 Ret.
Nadia Petrova  [19] def. Svetlana Kuznetsova  [3] 6–3 3–6 6–1
Zheng Jie  def. Alona Bondarenko  [31] 7–6(5) 6–4
Justine Henin  def. Yanina Wickmayer  7–6(3) 1–6 6–3

January 23, 2010 (Saturday)

Alpine skiing
Men's World Cup in Kitzbühel, Austria:
Downhill:  Didier Cuche  1:53.74  Andrej Šporn  1:54.02  Werner Heel  1:54.13
Downhill standings (after 6 of 8 races): (1) Cuche 396 (2) Carlo Janka  308 (3) Manuel Osborne-Paradis  235
Overall standings (after 22 of 34 races): (1) Janka 793 (2) Benjamin Raich  743 (3) Cuche 726
Women's World Cup in Cortina, Italy:
Downhill:  Lindsey Vonn  1:37.70  Maria Riesch  1:38.12  Anja Paerson  & Nadja Kamer  1:38.56
Downhill standings (after 5 of 8 races): (1) Vonn 500 (2) Riesch 316 (3) Paerson 275
Overall standings (after 22 of 33 races): (1) Vonn 1094 (2) Riesch 1018 (3) Kathrin Zettel  829

Biathlon
World Cup 6 in Antholz-Anterselva, Italy:
10 km Sprint Men:  Arnd Peiffer  24:27.4 (0 penalties)  Dominik Landertinger  24:33.4 (1)  Christoph Stephan  24:42.5 (0)
Overall standings (after 13 of 25 races): (1) Evgeny Ustyugov  412 points (2) Simon Fourcade  395 (3) Tim Burke  393
Sprint standings (after 6 of 10 races): (1) Ole Einar Bjørndalen  201 points (2) Landertinger 192 (3) Michael Greis  191

Bobsleigh
World Cup and European championships in Igls, Austria:
Two-man:  Beat Hefti/Thomas Lamparter  1:44.01  André Lange/Kevin Kuske  1:44.12  Daniel Schmid/Juerg Egger  1:44.37
Final standings: (1) Ivo Rüegg  1514 (2) Thomas Florschütz  1475 (3) Karl Angerer  1474

Cricket
ICC Intercontinental Shield in Dubai:
 361 and 282/9d;  373 and 79/6. Match drawn.
Standings: Uganda 29 points (2 matches), United Arab Emirates 17 (2),  6 (1),  0 (1).

Cross-country skiing
World Cup in Rybinsk, Russia:
Women's Sprint Freestyle:  Vesna Fabjan   Magda Genuin   Justyna Kowalczyk 
Overall standings: (1) Kowalczyk 1285 points (2) Petra Majdič  1147 (3) Aino-Kaisa Saarinen  909
Men's Sprint Freestyle:  Nikolay Morilov   Alexey Petukhov   Nikita Kriukov 
Overall standings: (1) Petter Northug  1060 points (2) Lukáš Bauer  763 (3) Marcus Hellner  627

Cycling
UCI ProTour:
Tour Down Under in Australia:
Stage 5 – Snapper Point to Willunga, :
General classification :

Figure skating
European Championships in Tallinn, Estonia:
Ladies:  Carolina Kostner  173.46  Laura Lepistö  166.37  Elene Gedevanishvili  164.54
Kostner wins the title for the third time in four years. Gedevanishvili wins the first ever medal for Georgia in figure skating championships.
U.S. Championships in Spokane, Washington:
Senior Ice Dancing:  Meryl Davis/Charlie White 222.29  Tanith Belbin/Benjamin Agosto 218.51  Emily Samuelson/Evan Bates 190.69
Davis and White win their second consecutive title.
Senior Ladies:  Rachael Flatt 200.11  Mirai Nagasu 188.78  Ashley Wagner 184.70.
Flatt wins her first national title. Olympic silver medallist Sasha Cohen finishes fourth and fails to qualify for the 2010 Olympics.

Futsal
European Championship in Hungary: (teams in bold advance to the quarterfinals)
Group A:  6–5 
Final standings: Azerbaijan 6 points, Czesh Republic 3, Hungary 0.
Group B:  2–4 
Final standings: Italy 6 points, Ukraine 3, Belgium 0.

Handball
European Men's Championship in Austria: (teams in bold advance to the Main Round)
Group A in Graz:
 30–28 
 31–29 
Final standings: Croatia 6 points, Norway 4, Russia 2, Ukraine 2.
Group B in Linz:
 22–27 
 37–31 
Final standings: Iceland, Denmark 4 points, Austria 3, Serbia 1.

Luge
European Championships in Sigulda, Latvia:
Women:  Tatiana Ivanova  1:25.517  Corinna Martini  1:25.842  Nina Reithmayer  1:26.007
Doubles:  Andreas Linger/Wolfgang Linger  1:24.415  Tobias Wendl/Tobias Arlt  1:24.977  Tobias Schiegl/Markus Schiegl  1:25.023

Nordic combined
World Cup in Schonach, Germany:
HS96 / 10 km:  Jason Lamy-Chappuis  21:34.5  Pavel Churavý  21:36.6  Alessandro Pittin  21:38.9
Standings (after 14 of 19 events): (1) Lamy-Chappuis 969 points (2) Felix Gottwald  589 (3) Magnus Moan  542

Rugby union
Heineken Cup pool stage, matchday 6: (teams in bold advance to the quarterfinals; teams in italics parachute into the Amlin Challenge Cup)
Pool 3:
Viadana  20–59  Clermont Auvergne
Ospreys  17–12  Leicester Tigers
Final standings: Clermont 21 points, Ospreys 20, Leicester 18, Viadana 0.
Pool 4:
Bath  10–28 (Ireland) Ulster
Edinburgh  9–7  Stade Français
Final standings: Stade Français 18 points, Ulster 17, Edinburgh 13, Bath 7.
Pool 6:
Brive  17–20  Scarlets
London Irish  11–11 (Ireland) Leinster
Leinster secure a home quarterfinal. This result also secures a Heineken Cup quarterfinal berth for Northampton Saints as one of the top two runners-up.
Final standings: Leinster 22 points, Scarlets 17 (8–1 on head-to-head competition points), London Irish 17, Brive 1.
Amlin Challenge Cup pool stage, matchday 6: (teams in bold advance to the quarterfinals)
Pool 1: Overmach Parma  16–9  București Oaks
Standings: Leeds Carnegie, Bourgoin 19 points (5 matches); Overmach Parma 8 (6); București Oaks 7 (6).
Pool 2: Olympus Madrid  0–66 (Ireland) Connacht
Connacht secure the top seed for the quarterfinals, meaning that they avoid a quarterfinal against a Heineken Cup team.
Final standings: Connacht 26 points, Montpellier 19, Worcester Warriors 13, Olympus Madrid 0.
Pool 3:
Rovigo  8–56  Saracens
Toulon  42–10  Castres
Final standings: Toulon 23 points, Saracens 22, Castres 11, Rovigo 0
Pool 4: Rugby Roma Olimpic  6–55  Bayonne
Final standings: London Wasps 22 points, Bayonne 19, Racing Métro 16, Roma 0.

Skeleton
World Cup and European championships in Igls, Austria:
Men:  Martins Dukurs  1:46.14  Frank Rommel  1:46.39  Aleksandr Tretyakov  1:46.49
Final standings: (1) Dukurs 1694 points (2) Rommel 1466 (3) Sandro Stielicke  1438

Ski jumping
World Cup in Zakopane, Poland:
HS 134:  Gregor Schlierenzauer  295.6 points  Simon Ammann  288.1  Thomas Morgenstern  276.2
Individual standings (after 16 of 23 events): (1) Ammann 1099 (2) Schlierenzauer 996 (3) Morgenstern 699

Snowboarding
World Cup in Quebec City, Canada:
Men's big air:  Janne Korpi   Stefan Falkeis   Jaakko Ruha 
Final standings: (1) Stefan Gimpl  4300 points (2) Gian-Luca Cavigelli  3320 (3) Matevz Pristavec  1620

Tennis
Australian Open in Melbourne, Australia, day 6:
Men's Singles – 3rd Round:
Roger Federer  [1] def. Albert Montañés  [31] 6–3 6–4 6–4
Novak Djokovic  [3] def. Denis Istomin  6–1 6–1 6–2
Nikolay Davydenko  [6] def. Juan Mónaco  [30] 6–0 6–3 6–4
Fernando Verdasco  [9] def. Stefan Koubek  6–1 ret.
Jo-Wilfried Tsonga  [10] def. Tommy Haas  [18] 6–4 3–6 6–1 7–5
Women's Singles – 3rd Round:
Serena Williams  [1] def. Carla Suárez Navarro  [32] 6–0 6–3
Caroline Wozniacki  [4] def. Shahar Pe'er  [29] 6–4 6–0
Venus Williams  [6] def. Casey Dellacqua  6–1 7–6(4)
Victoria Azarenka  [7] def. Tathiana Garbin  6–0 6–2
Vera Zvonareva  [9] def. Gisela Dulko  6–1 7–5
Francesca Schiavone  [17] def. Agnieszka Radwańska  [10] 6–2 6–2

January 22, 2010 (Friday)

Alpine skiing
Men's World Cup in Kitzbühel, Austria:
Super-G:  Didier Cuche  1:17.94  Michael Walchhofer  1:18.22  Georg Streitberger  1:18.23
Super-G standings (after 4 of 6 races): (1) Walchhofer 260 (2) Aksel Lund Svindal  194 (3) benjamin Raich  158
Overall standings (after 21 of 34 races): (1) Carlo Janka  769 (2) Benjamin Raich  743 (3) Cuche 626
Women's World Cup in Cortina, Italy:
Super-G:  Lindsey Vonn  1:21.74  Fabienne Suter  1:22.41  Anja Paerson  1::22.48
Super-G standings (after 4 of 6 races): (1) Vonn 340 (2) Suter 170 (3) Elisabeth Görgl  162
Overall standings (after 21 of 33 races): (1) Vonn 994 (2) Maria Riesch  938 (3) Kathrin Zettel  829

Biathlon
World Cup 6 in Antholz-Anterselva, Italy:
7.5 km Sprint Women:  Magdalena Neuner  20:19.7 (1 penalty lap)  Andrea Henkel  20:32.9 (0)  Sandrine Bailly  20:48.3 (0)
Sprint standings (after 6 of 10 races): (1) Kati Wilhelm  208 (2) Anna Carin Olofsson-Zidek  207 (3) Helena Jonsson  206
Overall standings (after 13 of 25 races): (1) Helena Jonsson  536 (2) Anna Carin Olofsson-Zidek  435 (3) Kati Wilhelm  427

Bobsleigh
World Cup in Igls, Austria:
Two-woman:  Shauna Rohbock/Michelle Rzepka  1:47.13  Cathleen Martini/Romy Logsch  1:47.44  Kaillie Humphries/Heather Moyse  1:47.46
Final standings: (1) Sandra Kiriasis  1608 (2) Humphries 1563 (3) Martini 1545
European championships in Igls, Austria:
Two-woman:  Cathleen Martini/Romy Logsch  1:47.44  Sabina Rafner/Hanne Schenk  1:47.61  Sandra Kiriasis/Christin Senkel  1:47.82

Cricket
Pakistan in Australia:
1st ODI in Brisbane:
 274 (49.4 overs);  275/5 (48.3 overs, Cameron White 105). Australia win by 5 wickets, lead the 5-match series 1–0.

Cross-country skiing
World Cup in Rybinsk, Russia:
Women's Sprint Freestyle:  Vesna Fabjan   Magda Genuin   Justyna Kowalczyk 
Sprint standings (after 8 of 12 events): (1) Petra Majdic  422 (2) Kowalczyk 339 (3) Aino-Kaisa Saarinen  295
Overall standings (after 20 of 31 events): (1) Kowalczyk 1285 (2) Petra Majdic  1147 (3) Aino-Kaisa Saarinen  909
Men's Sprint Freestyle:  Nikolay Morilov   Alexey Petukhov   Nikita Kriukov 
Sprint standings (after 8 of 12 events): (1) Ola Vigen Hattestad  250 (2) Kriukov 248 (3) Petukhov 241
Overall standings (after 20 of 31 events): (1) Petter Northug  1060 (2) Lukáš Bauer  763 (3) Marcus Hellner  627

Cycling
UCI ProTour:
Tour Down Under in Australia:
Stage 4 – Norwood to Goolwa, :
General classification :

Figure skating
European Championships in Tallinn, Estonia:
Ladies – Short Program: (1) Carolina Kostner  65.80 (2) Kiira Korpi  64.26 (3) Laura Lepistö  62.96
Ice Dancing:  Oksana Domnina/Maxim Shabalin  199.25  Federica Faiella/Massimo Scali  195.86  Jana Khokhlova/Sergei Novitski 189.67
Domnina and Shabalin win their second title in three years.
U.S. Championships in Spokane, Washington:
Senior Ice Dancing – standings after Original Dance: (1) Meryl Davis/Charlie White 113.53 (2) Tanith Belbin/Benjamin Agosto 111.91 (3) Emily Samuelson/Evan Bates 96.96

Freestyle skiing
World Cup in Lake Placid, United States:
Men's aerials:  Anton Kushnir  253.10  Warren Shouldice  251.55  Ryan Blais  250.80
Aerials standings (after 5 of 6 events): (1) Kushnir 440 (2) Zongyang Jia  236 (3) Guangpu Qi  185
Women's aerials:  Lydia Lassila  203.38  Nina Li  197.56  Zhang Xin  181.72
Aerials standings (after 5 of 6 events): (1) Li 336 (2) Xinxin Guo 306 (3) Mengtao Xu 278

Futsal
European Championship in Hungary: (teams in bold advance to the quarterfinals)
Group C:  0–2 
Standings: Russia, Serbia 3 points (1 match), Slovenia 0 (2).
Group D:  5–5 
Standings: Spain 3 points (1 match), Portugal 1 (1), Belarus 1 (2).

Handball
European Men's Championship in Austria: (teams in bold advance to the Main Round)
Group C in Innsbruck:
 30–29 
 30–30 
Final standings: Poland 5 points, Slovenia 4, Germany 3, Sweden 0.
Group D in Wiener Neustadt:
 24–24 
 26–33 
Final standings: Spain 5 points, France 4, Czech Republic 2, Hungary 1.

Rugby union
Heineken Cup pool stage, matchday 6: (teams in bold advance to the quarterfinals; teams in italics assured of at least a berth in the Amlin Challenge Cup quarterfinals)
Pool 1:
Munster (Ireland) 12–9  Northampton Saints
Munster also assure themselves a home quarterfinal. This result also secures a spot in the Heineken Cup quarterfinals for their Irish rivals Leinster.
Perpignan  34–6  Benetton Treviso
Final standings: Munster 24 points, Northampton Saints 19, Perpignan 11, Benetton Treviso 5.
Amlin Challenge Cup pool stage, matchday 6: (teams in bold advance to the quarterfinals)
Pool 2: Montpellier  8–3  Worcester Warriors
Standings: Connacht 21 points (5 matches), Montpellier 19 (6), Worcester Warriors 13 (6), Olympus Madrid 0 (5).
Pool 5:
Newcastle Falcons  20–3  Petrarca Padova
Montauban  27–20  Albi
Final standings: Newcastle Falcons 23 points, Montauban 21, Albi 12, Petrarca Padova 1.

Skeleton
World Cup in Igls, Austria:
Women:  Anja Huber  1:49.57  Kerstin Szymkowiak  1:49.93  Mellisa Hollingsworth  1:49.96
Final standings: (1) Hollingsworth 1646 points (2) Shelley Rudman  1604 (3) Szymkowiak 1574
European championships in Igls, Austria:
Women:  Anja Huber  1:49.57  Kerstin Szymkowiak  1:49.93  Shelley Rudman  1:50.25

Ski jumping
World Cup in Zakopane, Poland:
HS 134:  Gregor Schlierenzauer  289.8  Simon Ammann  278.1  Thomas Morgenstern  266.2
Individual standings (after 16 of 24 events): (1) Ammann 1019 (2) Schlierenzauer 896 (3) Morgenstern 639

Snowboarding
World Cup in Stoneham, Canada:
Men's half-pipe:  Janne Korpi  45.7  Jeff Batchelor  44.3  Antti Autti  41.8
Halfpipe standings (after 4 of 12 events): (1) Korpi 1730 (2) Kazuhiro Kokubo  1600 (3) Autti 1360
Women's half-pipe:  Xuetong Cai  46.6  Zhifeng Sun  42.7  Xu Chen  40.5
Halfpipe standings (after 4 of 12 events): (1) Cai 2240 (2) Sun 1805 (3) Chen 1390

Tennis
Australian Open in Melbourne, Australia, day 5:
Men's Singles – 3rd Round:
Rafael Nadal  [2] def. Philipp Kohlschreiber  [27] 6–4 6–2 2–6 7–5
Juan Martín del Potro  [4] def. Florian Mayer  6–3 0–6 6–4 7–5
Andy Murray  [5] def. Florent Serra  7–5 6–1 6–4
Andy Roddick  [7] def. Feliciano López  6–7(4) 6–4 6–4 7–6(3)
Women's Singles – 3rd Round:
Dinara Safina  [2] def. Elena Baltacha  6–1 6–2
Svetlana Kuznetsova  [3] def. Angelique Kerber  3–6 7–5 6–4
Alona Bondarenko  [31] def. Jelena Janković  [8] 6–2 6–3

January 21, 2010 (Thursday)

Biathlon
World Cup 6 in Antholz-Anterselva, Italy:
20 km Individual Men:  Serguei Sednev  54:06.7 (0 penalty minutes)  Daniel Mesotitsch  54:51.6 (2)  Alexis Bœuf  55:01.0 (1)
Individual standings (after 3 of 4 races): (1) Christoph Sumann  136 (2) Sednev 114 (3) Mesotitsch 99
Overall standings (after 12 of 25 events): (1) Evgeny Ustyugov  412 (3) Emil Hegle Svendsen  384 (3) Tim Burke  373

Cricket
India in Bangladesh:
1st Test in Chittagong, day 5:
 243 and 413/8d;  242 and 301 (Mushfiqur Rahim 101). India win by 113 runs, lead the 2-match series 1–0.

Cycling
UCI ProTour:
Tour Down Under in Australia:
Stage 3 – Unley to Stirling, :
General classification :

Figure skating
European Championships in Tallinn, Estonia:
Ice Dancing – standings after Original Dance: (1) Oksana Domnina/Maxim Shabalin  104.27 (2) Federica Faiella/Massimo Scali  99.15 (3) Jana Khokhlova/Sergei Novitski 96.46
Men:  Evgeni Plushenko  255.39  Stéphane Lambiel  238.54  Brian Joubert  236.45
Plushenko wins his sixth European title.
U.S. Championships in Spokane, Washington:
Senior Compulsory Dance: (1) Meryl Davis/Charlie White 45.42 (2) Tanith Belbin/Benjamin Agosto 45.02 (3) Kimberly Navarro/Brent Bommentre 37.60
Senior Ladies Short Program: (1) Mirai Nagasu 70.06 (2) Sasha Cohen 69.63 (3) Rachael Flatt 69.35

Football (soccer)
African Cup of Nations in Angola: (teams in bold advance to the quarterfinals)
Group D:
 1–2 
 2–2 
Final standings: Zambia, Cameroon, Gabon 4 points, Tunisia 3.

Freestyle skiing
World Cup in Lake Placid, United States:
Men's moguls:  Guilbaut Colas  26.51  Dale Begg-Smith  25.95  Jesper Bjoernlund  25.44
Moguls standings (after 7 of 12 events): (1) Begg-Smith 555 (2) Bjoernlund 412 (3) Colas 370
Women's moguls:  Hannah Kearney  25.13  Shannon Bahrke  24.96  Heather McPhie  24.08
Moguls standings (after 7 of 12 events): (1) Jennifer Heil  505 (2) McPhie 416 (3) Kearney 366

Futsal
European Championship in Hungary: (teams in bold advance to the quarterfinals)
Group A:  6–1 
Standings: Azerbaijan 6 points (2 matches), Hungary, Czech Republic 0 (1).
Group B:  2–4 
Standings: Italy, Ukraine 3 points (1 match), Belgium 0 (2).

Handball
European Men's Championship in Austria:
Group A in Graz:
 25–28 
 28–24 
Group B in Linz:
 23–28 
 37–37

Rugby union
Amlin Challenge Cup pool stage, matchday 6: (teams in bold advance to the quarterfinals)
Pool 4: Racing Métro  19–17  London Wasps
 Standings: Wasps 23 points (6 matches), Racing Métro 16 (6), Bourgoin 14 (5), Rugby Roma Olimpic 0 (5).

Snowboarding
World Cup in Stoneham, Canada:
Men's snowboard cross:  Pierre Vaultier   Graham Watanabe   Shaun Palmer 
Snowboard cross standings (after 5 of 12 races): (1) Vaultier 4800 (2) Watanabe 2120 (3) Nate Holland  1860
Women's snowboard cross:  Maëlle Ricker   Helene Olafsen   Dominique Maltais 
Snowboard cross standings (after 5 of 12 races): (1) Ricker 3960 (2) Olafsen 3050 (3) Maltais 2860

Tennis
Australian Open in Melbourne, Australia, day 4:
Men's Singles – 2nd Round:
Roger Federer  [1] def. Victor Hănescu  6–2 6–3 6–2
Novak Djokovic  [3] def. Marco Chiudinelli  3–6 6–1 6–1 6–3
Nikolay Davydenko  [6] def. Illya Marchenko  6–3 6–3 6–0
Fernando Verdasco  [9] def. Ivan Sergeyev  6–1 6–2 6–2
Jo-Wilfried Tsonga  [10] def. Taylor Dent  6–4 6–3 6–3
Women's Singles – 2nd Round:
Serena Williams  [1] def. Petra Kvitová  6–2 6–1
Caroline Wozniacki  [4] def. Julia Görges  6–3 6–1
Venus Williams  [6] def. Sybille Bammer  6–2 7–5
Victoria Azarenka  [7] def. Stefanie Vögele  6–4 6–0
Vera Zvonareva  [9] def. Iveta Benešová  6–0 6–3
Agnieszka Radwańska  [10] def. Alla Kudryavtseva  6–0 6–2

January 20, 2010 (Wednesday)

Biathlon
World Cup 6 in Antholz-Anterselva, Italy:
15 km Individual Women:  Magdalena Neuner  43:14.4 (3 penalty minutes)  Kati Wilhelm  43:19.9 (1)  Andrea Henkel  43:41.8 (2)
Individual standings (after 3 of 4 races): (1) Helena Jonsson  120 (2) Anna Carin Olofsson-Zidek  108 (3) Henkel 102
Overall standings (after 12 of 25 races): (1) Helena Jonsson  536 (2) Anna Carin Olofsson-Zidek  435 (3) Wilhelm 404

Cricket
India in Bangladesh:
1st Test in Chittagong, day 4:
 243 and 413/8d (Gautam Gambhir 116);  242 and 67/2. Bangladesh require another 348 runs with 8 wickets remaining.

Cycling
UCI ProTour:
Tour Down Under in Australia:
Stage 2 – Gawler to Hahndorf, :
General classification :

Figure skating
European Championships in Tallinn, Estonia:
Men – Short Program: (1) Evgeni Plushenko  91.30 (2) Brian Joubert  88.55 (3) Yannick Ponsero  82.40
Plushenko sets a World Record for the Short Program, an improvement of 0.64 point to his mark at the 2006 Winter Olympics.
Pairs:  Yuko Kavaguti/Alexander Smirnov  213.15  Aliona Savchenko/Robin Szolkowy  211.72  Maria Mukhortova/Maxim Trankov  202.03
Kavaguti/Smirnov win their first European title, upsetting three-times defending champions Savchenko/Szolkowy. They set a World Record for the Free Skating segment of 139.23, an improvement of 0.34 point to the old record of Shen Xue/ Zhao Hongbo .

Football (soccer)
African Cup of Nations in Angola: (teams in bold advance to the quarterfinals)
Group C:
 2–0 
 3–0 
Final standings: Egypt 9 points, Nigeria 6, Benin, Mozambique 1.
2011 Asian Cup qualification: (teams in bold advance to the final tournament)
Group A:  3–0 
Stadings (after 5 matches): Bahrain,  Japan 12 points, Yemen 6, Hong Kong 0.

Freestyle skiing
World Cup in Blue Mountain, Canada:
Men's skicross:  Andreas Matt   Lars lewen   Patrick Koller 
Skicross standings (after 6 of 12 events): (1) Michael Schmid  390 (2) Xavier Kuhn  271 (3) Matt 226
Women's skicross:  Marte Hoeie Gjefsen   Ashleigh McIvor   Sasa Faric 
Skicross standings (after 6 of 12 events): (1) Ophélie David  415 (2) McIvor 387 (3) Julia Murray  279

Futsal
European Championship in Hungary:
Group C:  5–1 
Group D:  9–1

Handball
European Men's Championship in Austria:
Group C in Innsbruck:
 34–34 
 27–24 
Group D in Wiener Neustadt:
 20–21 
 25–34

Tennis
Australian Open in Melbourne, Australia, day 3:
Men's Singles – 2nd Round:
Rafael Nadal  [2] def. Lukáš Lacko  6–2 6–2 6–2
Juan Martín del Potro  [4] def. James Blake  6–4 6–7(3) 5–7 6–3 10–8
Andy Murray  [5] def. Marc Gicquel  6–1 6–4 6–3
Andy Roddick  [7] def. Thomaz Bellucci  6–3 6–4 6–4
Women's Singles – 1st Round:
Caroline Wozniacki  [4] def. Aleksandra Wozniak  6–4, 6–0
Victoria Azarenka  [7] def. Stéphanie Cohen-Aloro  6–2 6–0
Vera Zvonareva  [9] def. Kristína Kučová  6–2 6–0
Women's Singles – 2nd Round:
Dinara Safina  [2] def. Barbora Záhlavová-Strýcová  6–3 6–4
Svetlana Kuznetsova  [3] def. Anastasia Pavlyuchenkova  6–2 6–2
Justine Henin  def. Elena Dementieva  [5] 7–5 7–6(6)
Jelena Janković  [8] def. Katie O'Brien  6–2 6–2

January 19, 2010 (Tuesday)

Cricket
India in Bangladesh:
1st Test in Chittagong, day 3:
 243 & 122/1 (22.2 ov);  242. India lead by 123 runs with 9 wickets remaining.

Cycling
UCI ProTour:
Tour Down Under in Australia:
Stage 1 – Clare to Tanunda, :  André Greipel  3h 15' 30"  Gert Steegmans  s.t.  Jürgen Roelandts  s.t.
General classification : (1) Greipel 3h 15' 20" (2) Steegmans + 4" (3) Martin Kohler  + 4"

Figure skating
European Championships in Tallinn, Estonia:
Ice Dancing – Compulsory Dance: (1) Oksana Domnina/Maxim Shabalin   42.78 (2) Jana Khokhlova/Sergei Novitski  37.87 (3) Federica Faiella/Massimo Scali  37.47
Pairs – Short Program: (1) Aliona Savchenko/Robin Szolkowy  74.12 (2) Yuko Kavaguti/Alexander Smirnov  73.92 (3) Maria Mukhortova/Maxim Trankov  73.54

Football (soccer)
African Cup of Nations in Angola: (teams in bold advance to the quarterfinals)
Group B:  0–1 
Final standings: Côte d'Ivoire 4 points, Ghana 3, Burkina Faso 1.

Futsal
European Championship in Hungary:
Group A:  1–3 
Group B:  4–0

Handball
European Men's Championship in Austria:
Group A in Graz:
 25–23 
 37–33 
Group B in Linz:
 33–29 
 29–29 
Group C in Innsbruck:
 25–27 
 25–27 
Group D in Wiener Neustadt:
 29–29 
 37–25

Tennis
Australian Open in Melbourne, Australia, day 2:
Men's Singles – 1st Round:
Roger Federer  [1] def. Igor Andreev  4–6, 6–2, 7–6(2), 6–0
Novak Djokovic  [3] def. Daniel Gimeno-Traver  7–5, 6–3, 6–2
Nikolay Davydenko  [6] def. Dieter Kindlmann  6–1, 6–0, 6–3
Marcel Granollers  def. Robin Söderling  [8] 5–7, 2–6, 6–4, 6–4, 6–2
Fernando Verdasco  [9] def. Carsten Ball  6–7(4), 7–6(1), 7–5, 6–2
Jo-Wilfried Tsonga  [10] def. Sergiy Stakhovsky  6–3, 6–4, 6–4
Women's Singles – 1st Round:
Serena Williams  [1] def. Urszula Radwańska  6–2, 6–1
Venus Williams  [6] def. Lucie Šafářová  6–2, 6–2
Jelena Janković  [8] def. Monica Niculescu  6–4, 6–0
Agnieszka Radwańska  [10] def. Tatjana Malek  6–1, 6–0
 In a 4-hour 19-minute marathon, the longest women's match by time in a Grand Slam event in the open era, Barbora Záhlavová-Strýcová  defeats Regina Kulikova  7–6(5), 6–7(10), 6–3.

January 18, 2010 (Monday)

Cricket
Pakistan in Australia:
3rd Test in Hobart, day 5:
 519/8d and 219/5d;  301 and 206. Australia win by 231 runs, and win the 3-match series 3–0.
Australia get their 12th straight Test win over Pakistan, and equal the record winning streak of Sri Lanka over Bangladesh.
India in Bangladesh:
1st Test in Chittagong, day 2:
 243 (Sachin Tendulkar 105*, Shahadat Hossain 5–71, Shakib Al Hasan 5–62);  59/3 (17.0 ov). Bangladesh trail by 184 runs with 7 wickets remaining in the 1st innings.
Tendulkar scores his 44th Test century.

Football (soccer)
African Cup of Nations in Angola: (teams in bold advance to the quarterfinals)
Group A:
 0–0 
 3–1 
Final standings: Angola 5 points, Algeria, Mali 4 (Algeria advance on head-to-head), Malawi 3.

Tennis
Australian Open in Melbourne, Australia, day 1:
Men's Singles – 1st Round:
Rafael Nadal  [2] def. Peter Luczak  7–6(0), 6–1, 6–4
Juan Martín del Potro  [4] def. Michael Russell  6–4, 6–4, 3–6, 6–2
Andy Murray  [5] def. Kevin Anderson  6–1, 6–1, 6–2
Andy Roddick  [7] def. Thiemo de Bakker  6–1, 6–4, 6–4
Women's Singles – 1st Round:
Dinara Safina  [2] def. Magdaléna Rybáriková  6–4, 6–4
Svetlana Kuznetsova  [3] def. Anastasia Rodionova  6–1, 6–2
Elena Dementieva  [5] def. Vera Dushevina  6–2, 6–1

January 17, 2010 (Sunday)

Alpine skiing
Men's World Cup in Wengen, Switzerland:
Slalom:  Ivica Kostelić   Andre Myhrer   Reinfried Herbst 
Overall standings (after 20 of 34 races): (1) Carlo Janka  757 points (2) Benjamin Raich  739 (3) Didier Cuche  526
Slalom standings (after 5 of 9 races): (1) Herbst 305 points (2) Julien Lizeroux  286 (3) Kostelić 240
Women's World Cup in Maribor, Slovenia:
Slalom:  Kathrin Zettel   Tina Maze   Maria Riesch 
Overall standings (after 20 from 33 races): (1) Riesch 922 points (2) Lindsey Vonn  894 (3) Zettel 829
Slalom standings (after 7 from 8 races): (1) Riesch 433 points (2) Zettel 410 (3) Sandrine Aubert  361

American football
NFL Divisional Playoffs: (seedings in parenthesis)
NFC: (2) Minnesota Vikings 34, (3) Dallas Cowboys 3
Brett Favre passes for four touchdowns, three of them to Sidney Rice, and leads the Vikings to the NFC Championship Game against the New Orleans Saints at the Superdome.
AFC: (5) New York Jets 17, (2) San Diego Chargers 14
Buoyed by 128 yards (including a 53-yard touchdown run) from Shonn Greene and three missed field goals by Nate Kaeding, the Jets will head to the AFC Championship Game next Sunday against the Indianapolis Colts at Lucas Oil Stadium.  Philip Rivers throws for 298 yards and a touchdown for the Chargers, but was intercepted twice.

Badminton
Korea Open Super Series in Seoul:
Men's singles: Lee Chong Wei 
Women's singles: Wang Shixian 
Men's doubles: Jung Jae Sung/Lee Yong Dae 
Women's doubles: Cheng Shu/Zhao Yunlei 
Mixed doubles: He Hanbin/Yu Yang

Biathlon
World Cup 5 in Ruhpolding, Germany:
4 x 7.5 km Relay Men:  Russia (Ivan Tcherezov, Anton Shipulin, Maxim Tchoudov, Evgeny Ustyugov) 1:22:29.8 (0 penalty loops+2 extra bullets)  Norway (Halvard Hanevold, Tarjei Bø, Ole Einar Bjørndalen, Emil Hegle Svendsen) 1:22:58.4 (0+6)  Austria (Daniel Mesotitsch, Friedrich Pinter, Tobias Eberhard, Dominik Landertinger) 1:24:04.6 (1+9)
Standings (after 4 of 5 races): (1) Norway 208 points (2) Austria 199 (3) Russia 197

Bobsleigh
World Cup in St. Moritz, Switzerland:
Four-man:  André Lange, René Hoppe, Kevin Kuske, Martin Putze  2:10.13  Karl Angerer, Alex Mann, Andreas Bredau, Gregor Bermbach  2:10.38  Alexandr Zubkov, Filipp Yegorov, Dmitry Trunenkov, Petr Moiseev  2:10.48
Standings (after 6 of 8 races): (1) Steven Holcomb  1455 points (2) John Napier  1186 (3) Jānis Miņins  1162

Cricket
England in South Africa:
4th Test in Johannesburg, day 4:
 180 and 169 (42.5 ov);  423/7d. South Africa win by an innings and 74 runs, 4-match series drawn 1–1.
Pakistan in Australia:
3rd Test in Hobart, day 4:
 519/8d & 219/5d (Simon Katich 100);  301 & 103/4 (34.2 ov). Pakistan require another 335 runs with 6 wickets remaining.
Katich scores his ninth Test century, and Ricky Ponting scores 89 runs for a career-high aggregate of 298.
India in Bangladesh:
1st Test in Chittagong, day 1:
 213/8 (63.0 ov)

Cross-country skiing
World Cup in Otepää, Estonia:
Women's Sprint Classic:  Hanna Falk   Petra Majdič   Aino-Kaisa Saarinen 
Overall standings: (1) Justyna Kowalczyk  1221 points (2) Majdič 1113 (3) Saarinen 892
Men's Sprint Classic:  Emil Jönsson   Ola Vigen Hattestad   Nikita Kriukov 
Overall standings: (1) Petter Northug  1060 points (2) Lukáš Bauer  763 (3) Marcus Hellner  627

Figure skating
Canadian Championships in London, Ontario:
Senior Men:  Patrick Chan 268.02  Vaughn Chipeur 222.10  Kevin Reynolds 216.49
Chan wins the title for the third straight year.
U.S. Championships in Spokane, Washington:
Senior Men:  Jeremy Abbott 263.66  Evan Lysacek 238.63  Johnny Weir  232.09
Abbott wins his second consecutive title.

Football (soccer)
African Cup of Nations in Angola:
Group D:
 0–0 
 3–2 
Standings (after 2 matches): Gabon 4 points, Cameroon 3, Tunisia 2, Zambia 1.
2011 Asian Cup qualification: (teams in bold advance to the final tournament)
Group D:  1–2 
Standings: China PR 13 points (6 matches), Syria 11 (5), Vietnam 5 (6), Lebanon 1 (5).

Golf
PGA Tour:
Sony Open in Hawaii in Honolulu, Hawaii:
Winner: Ryan Palmer  265 (−15)
In the first full-field event of the season, Palmer wins his third career title.
European Tour:
Joburg Open in Johannesburg, South Africa:
Winner: Charl Schwartzel  261 (−23)
Schwartzel sets a tournament record as he wins his second consecutive title and the 6th of his career.

Luge
World Cup in Oberhof, Germany:
Men:  Andi Langenhan  1:31.383  Johannes Ludwig  1:31.466  Jan-Armin Eichhorn  1:31.477
Standings (after 7 of 8 races): (1) Armin Zöggeler  605 points (2) Albert Demtschenko  524 (3) David Möller  436
Teams:  Germany (David Möller, Tatjana Hüfner, Patric Leitner/Alexander Resch) 2:29.779  Austria (Daniel Pfister, Nina Reithmayer, Andreas Linger/Wolfgang Linger) 2:30.258  Italy (Armin Zöggeler, Sandra Gasparini, Christian Oberstolz/Patrick Gruber) 2:30.684
Final standings: (1) Germany 400 points (2) Austria 395 (3) Canada 341

Nordic combined
World Cup in Chaux-Neuve, France:
HS100 / 10 km:  Magnus Moan  24:10.8  Jason Lamy-Chappuis  24:11.8  Mario Stecher  24:24.4
Standings (after 13 of 19 events): (1) Lamy-Chappuis 869 points (2) Felix Gottwald  589 (3) Moan 542

Rugby union
Heineken Cup pool stage, matchday 5: (teams in bold advance to the quarterfinals; teams in italics assured of at least an Amlin Challenge Cup quarterfinal; teams in strike are eliminated from all European competition)
Pool 1: Northampton Saints  34–0  Perpignan
Standings: Munster 20 points, Northampton Saints 18, Perpignan 6, Benetton Treviso 5.
Pool 5: Toulouse  33–21  Harlequins
Standings: Toulouse 19 points, Sale Sharks 13 (5–4 on head-to-head competition points), Cardiff Blues 13, Harlequins 2.
Pool 6: Scarlets  31–22  London Irish
Standings: Leinster 20 points, London Irish 15, Scarlets 13, Brive 0.

Ski jumping
World Cup in Sapporo, Japan:
HS 134:  Simon Ammann  293.1 points (139.5m/135.0m)  Noriaki Kasai  255.7 (131.0m/123.0m)  Martin Koch  255.4 (136.0m/119.5m)
World Cup standings (after 14 of 23 events): (1) Ammann 939 points (2) Gregor Schlierenzauer  796 (3) Andreas Kofler  587

Speed skating
World Sprint Championships in Obihiro, Japan:
Ladies' final classification:  Lee Sang-hwa  154.580  Sayuri Yoshii  154.830  Jenny Wolf  155.110
Men's final classification:  Lee Kyou-hyuk  139.910  Lee Kang-seok  140.880  Keiichiro Nagashima  141.060

Snooker
Masters in London, England:
Final: Mark Selby  (7) def. Ronnie O'Sullivan  (1) 10–9
Selby rallies from 6–9 down to win the title for the second time in three years.

Snowboarding
World Cup in Nendaz, Switzerland:
Men's parallel giant slalom:  Michael Lambert   Andreas Prommegger   Benjamin Karl 
Standings (after 5 of 9 events): (1) Karl 3260 points (2) Jasey-Jay Anderson  3200 (3) Lambert 2580
Women's parallel giant slalom:  Ekaterina Tudegesheva   Nicolien Sauerbreij   Fraenzi Maegert-Kohli 
Standings (after 5 of 9 events): (1) Sauerbreij 2530 (2) Maegert-Kohli 2520 (3) Amelie Kober  2470

January 16, 2010 (Saturday)

Alpine skiing
Men's World Cup in Wengen, Switzerland:
Downhill:  Carlo Janka   Manuel Osborne-Paradis   Marco Buechel 
Overall standings (after 19 of 34 races): (1) Janka 757 points (2) Benjamin Raich  689 (3) Didier Cuche  526
Downhill standings (after 5 of 8 races): (1) Cuche 296 points (2) Janka 284 (3) Osborne-Paradis 224
Women's World Cup in Maribor, Slovenia:
Giant slalom:  Kathrin Zettel   Maria Riesch   Anja Paerson 
Overall standings (after 19 from 33 races): (1) Lindsey Vonn  894 points (2) Riesch 862 (3) Zettel 729
Giant slalom standings (after 5 from 7 races): (1) Zettel 365 points (2) Kathrin Hölzl  331 (3) Tina Maze  222

American football
NFL Divisional Playoffs (seedings in parentheses):
NFC: (1) New Orleans Saints 45, (4) Arizona Cardinals 14
Reggie Bush scores two touchdowns – including an 83-yard punt return – and the Saints go marching into next Sunday's NFC Championship Game as the hosts.
AFC: (1) Indianapolis Colts 20, (6) Baltimore Ravens 3
Peyton Manning throws for two touchdowns and the Ravens commit six turnovers as the Colts advance to host next week's AFC Championship Game.

Auto racing
Dakar Rally in Argentina and Chile, final standings:
Motorcycles:  Cyril Despres  (KTM) 51h 10' 37"  Pal Anders Ullevalseter  (KTM) 52h 13' 29"  Francisco López Contardo  (Aprilia) 52h 20' 25"
All-terrain vehicle (Quad):  Marcos Patronelli  (Yamaha) 64h 17' 44"  Alejandro Patronelli  (Yamaha) 66h 40' 43"  Juan Manuel González Corominas  (Yamaha) 69h 25' 15"
Cars:  Carlos Sainz/Lucas Cruz  (Volkswagen) 47h 10' 00"  Nasser Al-Attiyah /Timo Gottschalk  (Volkswagen) 47h 12' 12"  Mark Miller /Ralph Pitchford  (Volkswagen) 47h 42' 51"
Trucks:  Vladimir Chagin/Sergey Savostin/Eduard Nikolaev  (Kamaz) 55h 04' 47"  Firdaus Kabirov/Aydar Belyaev/Andrey Mokeev  (Kamaz) 56h 17' 55"  Marcel van Vliet/Herman Vaanholt/Gerard van Veenendaal  (GINAF) 65h 48' 07"

Biathlon
World Cup 5 in Ruhpolding, Germany:
15 km Mass Start Men:  Emil Hegle Svendsen  39:19.5 (0 penalty loop)  Evgeny Ustyugov  39:24.6 (1)  Simon Eder  39:29.4 (1)
Overall standings (after 11 of 25 events): (1) Ustyugov 412 points (2) Svendsen 384 (3) Simon Fourcade  368
12.5 km Mass Start Women:  Helena Jonsson  40:58.7 (0 penalty loops)  Simone Hauswald  41:21.8 (2)  Magdalena Neuner  41:33.7 (5)
Overall standings (after 11 of 25 events): (1) Jonsson 536 points (2) Anna Carin Olofsson-Zidek  435 (3) Svetlana Sleptsova  357

Bobsleigh
World Cup in St. Moritz, Switzerland:
Two-man:  Lyndon Rush/Lascelles Brown  & André Lange/Kevin Kuske  2:12.34  Edwin Van Calker/Sybren Jansma  2:12.48
Standings (after 7 of 8 races): (1) Ivo Rüegg  1362 points (2) Thomas Florschütz  1291 (3) Karl Angerer  1282
Two-woman:  Cathleen Martini/Romy Logsch  2:14.89  Sandra Kiriasis/Christin Senkel  2:14.90  Claudia Schramm/Berit Wiacker  2:15.07
Standings (after 7 of 8 races): (1) Kiriasis 1432 (2) Kaillie Humphries  1363 (3) Martini 1335

Cricket
England in South Africa:
4th Test in Johannesburg, day 3:
 180 & 48/3 (13.2 ov);  423/7d. England trail by 195 runs with 7 wickets remaining.
Pakistan in Australia:
3rd Test in Hobart, day 3:
 519/8d & 59/1 (18.0 ov);  301 (Salman Butt 102). Australia lead by 277 runs with 9 wickets remaining.

Cross-country skiing
World Cup in Otepää, Estonia:
Women's 10 km Classic:  Justyna Kowalczyk  26:52.7  Marit Bjørgen  26:56.9  Aino-Kaisa Saarinen  27:22.6
Overall standings: (1) Kowalczyk 1189 points (2) Petra Majdič  1067 (3) Saarinen 849
Men's 15 km Classic:  Lukáš Bauer  36:45.7  Andrus Veerpalu  37:02.6  Jaak Mae  37:27.3
Overall standings: (1) Petter Northug  1060 points (2) Bauer 763 (3) Marcus Hellner  627

Figure skating
Canadian Championships in London, Ontario:
Senior Pairs:  Jessica Dubé/Bryce Davison 198.27  Anabelle Langlois/Cody Hay 183.42  Meagan Duhamel/Craig Buntin 172.18
Dubé and Davison win their third title.
Senior Women:  Joannie Rochette 208.23  Cynthia Phaneuf 182.55  Myriane Samson 151.10
Rochette wins the title for the sixth straight year.
Senior Ice Dancing:  Tessa Virtue/Scott Moir 221.95  Vanessa Crone/Paul Poirier 184.70  Kaitlyn Weaver/Andrew Poje 184.40
Virtue and Moir win their third straight title.
U.S. Championships in Spokane, Washington:
Senior Pairs:  Caydee Denney/Jeremy Barrett 190.30  Amanda Evora/Mark Ladwig 173.78  Rena Inoue/John Baldwin 173.18
Denney and Barrett win their first national title.

Football (soccer)
African Cup of Nations in Angola: (teams in bold advance to the quarterfinals)
Group C:
 1–0 
 0–2 
Standings (after 2 matches): Egypt 6 points, Nigeria 3, Benin, Mozambique 1.

Freestyle skiing
World Cup in Deer Valley, United States:
Men's moguls:  Guilbaut Colas   Dale Begg-Smith   Alexandre Bilodeau 
Standings (after 6 of 12 events): (1) Begg-Smith 475 points (2) Jesper Bjoernlund  352 (3) Colas 270
Women's moguls:  Jennifer Heil   Heather McPhie   Michelle Roark 
Standings (after 6 of 12 events): (1) Heil 505 points (2) McPhie 356 (3) Kristi Richards  272

Horse racing
Zenyatta, unbeaten winner of the 2009 Breeders' Cup Classic, will not be retired as a broodmare as originally planned, but will race in 2010. (The Blood-Horse)

Luge
World Cup in Oberhof, Germany:
Doubles:  André Florschütz/Torsten Wustlich  1:25.567  Tobias Wendl/Tobias Arlt  1:25.633  Patric Leitner/Alexander Resch  1:26.001
Standings (after 7 of 8 races): (1) Florschütz/Wustlich 542 points (2) Leitner/Resch 500 (3) Christian Oberstolz/Patrick Gruber  462
Women:  Tatjana Hüfner  1:25.936  Anke Wischnewski  1:26.203  Natalie Geisenberger  1:26.322
Standings (after 7 of 8 races): (1) Hüfner 670 points (2) Geisenberger 610 (3) Wischnewski 470

Nordic combined
World Cup in Chaux-Neuve, France:
HS100 / 10 km:  Magnus Moan  23:30.7  Jason Lamy-Chappuis  23:34.9  Todd Lodwick  23:37.8
Standings (after 12 of 19 events): (1) Lamy-Chappuis 789 points (2) Felix Gottwald  553 (3) Tino Edelmann  480

Rugby union
Heineken Cup pool stage, matchday 5: (teams in bold advance to the quarterfinals; teams in italics assured of at least an Amlin Challenge Cup quarterfinal; teams in strike are eliminated from all European competition)
Pool 1: Benetton Treviso  7–44 (Ireland) Munster
Standings: Munster 20 points (5 matches), Northampton Saints 13 (4), Perpignan 6 (4), Benetton Treviso 5 (5).
Pool 2: Gloucester  23–8  Biarritz
Standings: Biarritz 18 points, Gloucester 12, Glasgow Warriors 9, Newport Gwent Dragons 6.
Pool 3:
Leicester Tigers  47–8  Viadana
Clermont Auvergne  27–7  Ospreys
Standings: Leicester 17 points, Ospreys 16 (5–4 on head-to-head competition points), Clermont 16, Viadana 0.
Pool 4: Stade Français  15–13  Bath
Standings: Stade Français 17 points, Ulster 13, Edinburgh 9, Bath 6.
Pool 5: Cardiff Blues  36–19  Sale Sharks
Standings: Toulouse 14 points (4 matches), Sharks 13 (5 matches; 5–4 on head-to-head competition points), Blues 13 (5), Harlequins 2 (4).
Pool 6: Leinster (Ireland) 27–10  Brive
Standings: Leinster 20 points (5 matches), London Irish 15 (4), Scarlets 8 (4), Brive 0 (5).
Amlin Challenge Cup pool stage, matchday 5: (teams in bold advance to the quarterfinals, teams in strike are eliminated)
Pool 1: Overmach Parma  16–38  Leeds Carnegie
Standings: Leeds Carnegie, Bourgoin 19 points, București Oaks 6, Overmach Parma 4.
Pool 2: Worcester Warriors  54–3  Olympus Madrid
Standings: Connacht 21 points, Montpellier 15, Worcester Warriors 12, Olympus Madrid 0.
Pool 4: Bayonne  27–14  Racing Métro
Standings: London Wasps 22 points, Bayonne 14, Racing Métro 12, Rugby Roma Olimpic 0.
Pool 5: Petrarca Padova  23–31  Montauban
Standings: Newcastle Falcons 19 points, Montauban 17, Albi 11, Petrarca Padova 1.

Ski jumping
World Cup in Sapporo, Japan:
HS 134:  Thomas Morgenstern  271.5 points (131.5m/131.0m)  Andreas Wank  267.5 (126.0m/136.5m)  Daiki Ito  266.3 (133.5m/128.0m)
World Cup standings (after 13 of 23 events): (1) Simon Ammann  839 points (2) Gregor Schlierenzauer  796 (3) Andreas Kofler  587

Speed skating
World Sprint Championships in Obihiro, Japan:
Ladies' classification (after day 1): (1) Lee Sang-hwa  77.080 (2) Sayuri Yoshii  77.370 (3) Jenny Wolf  77.470
Men's classification (after day 1): (1) Lee Kyou-hyuk  69.940 (2) Ronald Mulder  70.480 (3) Keiichiro Nagashima  70.505

Tennis
ATP World Tour:
Medibank International Sydney in Sydney, Australia:
Final: Marcos Baghdatis  def. Richard Gasquet  6–4, 7–6(2).
Baghdatis wins the fourth title of his career.
Heineken Open in Auckland, New Zealand:
Final: John Isner  def. Arnaud Clément  6–3, 5–7, 7–6(2)
Isner wins his first career title.
WTA Tour:
Moorilla Hobart International in Hobart, Australia:
Final: Alona Bondarenko  def. Shahar Pe'er  6–2, 6–4
Bondarenko wins the second WTA Tour title of her career.
Exhibition tournaments:
AAMI Classic in Melbourne, Australia:
Final: Fernando Verdasco  def. Jo-Wilfried Tsonga  7–5, 6–3

January 15, 2010 (Friday)

Alpine skiing
Men's World Cup in Wengen, Switzerland:
Super combined:  Bode Miller   Carlo Janka   Silvan Zurbriggen 
Overall standings (after 18 of 34 races): (1) Benjamin Raich  689 points (2) Janka 657 (3) Aksel Lund Svindal  486
Combined standings (after 3 of 4 races): (1) Raich 186 points (2) Janka 180 (3) Miller 145

Biathlon
World Cup 5 in Ruhpolding, Germany:
4 x 6 km Relay Women:  Sweden (Elisabeth Högberg, Anna Carin Olofsson-Zidek, Anna Maria Nilsson, Helena Jonsson) 1:17:31.5 (0 penalty, 6 reloads)  Russia (Iana Romanova, Anna Boulygina, Olga Medvedtseva, Olga Zaitseva) 1:17:48.1 (0, 8)  Norway (Liv Kjersti Eikeland, Ann Kristin Flatland, Solveig Rogstad, Tora Berger) 1:18:00.5 (0, 6)
Standings (after 4 of 5 events): (1) Russia 228 points (2) Germany 200 (3) Sweden 191

Cricket
England in South Africa:
4th Test in Johannesburg, day 2:
 180;  215/2 (63.2 ov, Graeme Smith 105). South Africa lead by 35 runs with 8 wickets remaining in the 1st innings.
Pakistan in Australia:
3rd Test in Hobart, day 2:
 519/8d (Ricky Ponting 209, Michael Clarke 166);  94/4 (36.0 ov). Pakistan trail by 425 runs with 6 wickets remaining in the 1st innings.
Ponting scores his fifth Test double-century and the highest score by an Australian batsman in five years, while Clarke makes his highest Test score.

Figure skating
Canadian Championships in London, Ontario:
Senior Women Short Program: (1) Cynthia Phaneuf 66.30 (2) Joannie Rochette 64.15 (3) Amélie Lacoste 53.99
Senior Pairs Short Program: (1) Anabelle Langlois/Cody Hay 65.47 (2) Jessica Dubé/Bryce Davison 62.87 (3) Meagan Duhamel/Craig Buntin 62.38
Senior Ice Dancing – standings after Original Dance: (1) Tessa Virtue/Scott Moir 114.13 (2) Kaitlyn Weaver/Andrew Poje 94.79 (3) Vanessa Crone/Paul Poirier 94.77
Senior Men Short Program: (1) Patrick Chan 90.14 (2) Vaughn Chipeur 78.87 (3) Joey Russell 74.04
U.S. Championships in Spokane, Washington:
Senior Pairs Short Program: (1) Caydee Denney/Jeremy Barrett 63.01 (2) Caitlin Yankowskas/John Coughlin 62.09 (3) Amanda Evora/Mark Ladwig 58.76
Senior Men Short Program: (1) Jeremy Abbott 87.85 (2) Evan Lysacek 83.69 (3) Johnny Weir 83.51

Football (soccer)
African Cup of Nations in Angola: (teams in bold advance to the quarterfinals)
Group B:  3–1 
Standings: Côte d'Ivoire 4 points (2 matches), Burkina Faso 1 (1), Ghana 0 (1).

Freestyle skiing
World Cup in Deer Valley, United States:
Men's aerials:  Anton Kushnir   Qi Guangpu   Dmitri Dashinski 
Standings after 4 of 6 events: (1) Kushnir 340 points (2) Jia Zongyang  236 (3) Qi 185
Women's aerials:  Lydia Lassila   Xu Mengtao   Nina Li 
Standings after 4 of 6 events: (1) Guo Xinxin  290 points (2) Xu 269 (3) Nina 256

Rugby union
Heineken Cup pool stage, matchday 5: (teams in strike are eliminated)
Pool 2: Glasgow Warriors  29–25  Newport Gwent Dragons
Standings: Biarritz 18 points (4 matches), Glasgow Warriors 9 (5), Gloucester 8 (4), Newport Gwent Dragons 6 (5).
Pool 4: Ulster (Ireland) 21–13  Edinburgh
Standings: Ulster 13 points (5 matches), Stade Français 13 (4), Edinburgh 9 (5), Bath 6 (4).
Amlin Challenge Cup pool stage, matchday 5: (teams in bold advance to the quarterfinals, teams in strike are eliminated)
Pool 2: Connacht 20–10  Montpellier
Standings: Connacht 21 points (5 matches), Montpellier 15 (5), Worcester Warriors 7 (4), Olympus Madrid 0 (4).
Pool 3: Castres Olympique  47–0  Rovigo
Standings: Toulon 18 points, Saracens 17, Castres Olympique 11, Rovigo 0.
Pool 5: Albi  14–16  Newcastle Falcons
Standings: Newcastle Falcons 19 points (5 matches), Montauban 12 (4), Albi 11 (5), Petrarca Padova 1 (4).

Skeleton
World Cup in St. Moritz, Switzerland:
Men:  Eric Bernotas  1:09.15  Kristan Bromley  1:09.22  Martins Dukurs  1:09.33
Standings after 7 of 8 events: (1) Dukurs 1469 points (2) Sandro Stielicke  1270 (3) Frank Rommel  1256
Women:  Shelley Rudman  2:20.42  Mellisa Hollingsworth  2:20.46  Kerstin Szymkowiak  2:20.68
Standings after 7 of 8 events: (1) Hollingsworth 1446 points (2) Rudman 1412 (3) Szymkowiak 1364

Snowboarding
World Cup in Veysonnaz, Switzerland:
Men's snowboard cross:  Pierre Vaultier   David Speiser   Nick Baumgartner 
Standings after 5 of 8 events: (1) Vaultier 3800 points (2) Nate Holland  1740 (3) Robert Fagan  1620
Women's snowboard cross:  Helene Olafsen   Dominique Maltais   Maëlle Ricker 
Standings after 5 of 8 events: (1) Ricker 2960 points (2) Maltais 2260 (3) Olafsen 2250

Tennis
WTA Tour:
Medibank International Sydney in Sydney, Australia:
Final: Elena Dementieva  def. Serena Williams  6–3, 6–2
Dementieva wins this tournament for the second straight year and her 15th career title.

January 14, 2010 (Thursday)

Basketball
Euroleague Regular Season Game 10: (teams in bold advance to the Top 16 stage, teams in strike are eliminated)
Group A:
Cibona Zagreb  73–71  ASVEL Villeurbanne
Fenerbahçe Ülker Istanbul  68–76  Žalgiris Kaunas
Regal FC Barcelona  85–70  Montepaschi Siena
Final standings: Regal FC Barcelona 10–0, Montepaschi Siena 8–2, Žalgiris Kaunas, Cibona Zagreb, ASVEL Villeurbanne, Fenerbahçe Ülker 3–7.
Barcelona become the first team to go through the Regular Season unbeaten since CSKA Moscow in 2004–05.
Group C:
Maroussi Athens  83–75  Maccabi Tel Aviv
Lottomatica Roma  69–48  Union Olimpija Ljubljana
CSKA Moscow  84–83  Caja Laboral Baskonia
Final standings: CSKA Moscow 8–2, Caja Laboral Baskonia 7–3, Maccabi Tel Aviv 6–4, Maroussi Athens, Lottomatica Roma 4–6, Union Olimpija Ljubljana 1–9.

Biathlon
World Cup 5 in Ruhpolding, Germany:
10 km Sprint Men:  Emil Hegle Svendsen  23:27.5 (0 penalties)  Ole Einar Bjørndalen  23:30.7 (0)  Michael Greis  24:01.0 (0)
Overall standings (after 10 of 25 races): (1) Evgeny Ustyugov  358 points (2) Simon Fourcade  341 (3) Tim Burke  339
Sprint standings (after 5 of 10 races): (1) Bjørndalen 201 points (2) Greis 191 (3) Svendsen 186

Cricket
England in South Africa:
4th Test in Johannesburg, day 1:
 180 (47.5 ov, Dale Steyn 5–51);  29/0 (12.0 ov). South Africa trail by 151 runs with 10 wickets remaining in the 1st innings.
Pakistan in Australia:
3rd Test in Hobart, day 1:
 302/3 (90.0 ov, Ricky Ponting 137*, Michael Clarke 111*).
Ponting scores his 39th Test century, and together with Clarke they make a 231-run partnership, their highest in two years.

Figure skating
Canadian Championships in London, Ontario:
Senior Compulsory Dance: (1) Tessa Virtue/Scott Moir 43.98 (2) Vanessa Crone/Paul Poirier 37.27 (3) Kaitlyn Weaver/Andrew Poje 36.87

Football (soccer)
African Cup of Nations in Angola:
Group A:
 0–1 
 2–0 
Standings (after 2 matches): Angola 4 points, Malawi, Algeria 3, Mali 1.

Freestyle skiing
World Cup in Deer Valley, United States:
Men's moguls:  Dale Begg-Smith   Guilbaut Colas   Dmitriy Reiherd 
Standings (after 5 of 12 events): (1) Begg-Smith 395 points (2) Jesper Bjoernlund  326 (3) Alexandre Bilodeau  205
Women's moguls:  Jennifer Heil  & Heather McPhie   Shannon Bahrke 
Standings (after 5 of 12 events): (1) Heil 405 points (2) Hannah Kearney  276 (3) Kristi Richards  236

Rugby union
Amlin Challenge Cup pool stage, matchday 5: (teams in strike are eliminated)
Pool 1: Bourgoin  33–15  București Oaks
Standings: Bourgoin 19 points (5 matches), Leeds Carnegie 14 (4), București Oaks 6 (5), Overmach Parma 4 (4).
Pool 3: Saracens  28–9  Toulon
Standings: Toulon 18 points (5 matches), Saracens 17 (5), Castres Olympique 6 (4), Rovigo 0 (4).
Pool 4: London Wasps  50–16  Rugby Roma Olimpic
Standings: London Wasps 22 points (5 matches), Racing Métro 12 (4), Bayonne 10 (4), Rugby Roma Olimpic 0 (5).

January 13, 2010 (Wednesday)

Basketball
Euroleague Regular Season Game 10: (teams in bold advance to the Top 16 stage, teams in strike are eliminated)
Group B:
Entente Orléans Loiret  60–75  Efes Pilsen Istanbul
Lietuvos Rytas Vilnius  71–73  Unicaja Málaga
Olympiacos Piraeus  81–60  Partizan Belgrade
Final standings: Olympiacos Piraeus 8–2, Unicaja Málaga 7–3, Partizan Belgrade 5–5, Efes Pilsen Istanbul, Lietuvos Rytas Vilnius 4–6, Entente Orléans Loiret 2–8.
Group D:
Asseco Prokom Gdynia  75–70  Khimki Moscow Region
Armani Jeans Milano  66–75  Real Madrid
EWE Baskets Oldenburg  64–67  Panathinaikos Athens
Final standings: Real Madrid, Panathinaikos Athens 8–2, Khimki Moscow Region 6–4, Asseco Prokom Gdynia 4–6, Armani Jeans Milano 3–7, EWE Baskets Oldenburg 1–9.

Biathlon
World Cup 5 in Ruhpolding, Germany:
7.5 km Sprint Women:  Anna Carin Olofsson-Zidek  23:49.6 (0 penalty loops)  Olga Medvedtseva  24:19.4 (0)  Magdalena Neuner  24:30.2 (2)
Overall standings (after 10 of 25 races): (1) Helena Jonsson  476 points (2) Olofsson-Zidek 412 (3) Svetlana Sleptsova  357
Sprint standings (after 5 of 10 races): (1) Olofsson-Zidek 207 points (2) Jonsson 206 (3) Medvedtseva 192

Cricket
Tri-series in Bangladesh:
Final in Mirpur:
 245 (48.2 overs, Suresh Raina 106);  249/6 (48.3 overs). Sri Lanka win by 4 wickets.

Football (soccer)
African Cup of Nations in Angola:
Group D:
 0–1 
 1–1

Freestyle skiing
World Cup in Alpe d'Huez, France:
Men's skicross:  Christopher Delbosco   Tomas Krauz   Ted Piccard 
Standings after 5 of 12 events: (1) Michael Schmid  340 points (2) Xavier Kuhn  257 (3) Audun Groenvold  216
Women's skicross:  Kelsey Serwa   Ophélie David   Ashleigh McIvor 
Standings after 5 of 12 events: (1) David 370 points (2) McIvor 307 (3) Julia Murray  253

January 12, 2010 (Tuesday)

Alpine skiing
Women's World Cup in Flachau, Austria:
Slalom:  Marlies Schild   Maria Riesch   Kathrin Zettel 
Overall standings after 18 from 33 races: (1) Lindsey Vonn  894 points (2) Riesch 782 (3) Zettel 629
Slalom standings after 6 from 8 races: (1) Riesch 373 points (2) Schild 320 (3) Sandrine Aubert  316

Football (soccer)
African Cup of Nations in Angola:
Group C:
 3–1 
 2–2

January 11, 2010 (Monday)

Baseball
 Mark McGwire, tied for eighth on Major League Baseball's career home run list, admits to having used steroids for a decade, including in  when he set the single-season home run record. (ESPN)

Cricket
Tri-series in Bangladesh:
6th Match in Mirpur:
 247/6 (50 overs);  249/4 (43 overs, Virat Kohli 102*). India win by 6 wickets.
Final standings: India 13 points, Sri Lanka 12, Bangladesh 0.

Football (soccer)
African Cup of Nations in Angola:
Group A:  3–0 
Group B:  0–0

January 10, 2010 (Sunday)

Alpine skiing
Men's World Cup in Adelboden, Switzerland:
Slalom:  Julien Lizeroux   Marcel Hirscher   Ivica Kostelić 
Overall standings (after 17 of 34 races): (1) Benjamin Raich  639 points (2) Carlo Janka  577 (3) Didier Cuche  476
Slalom standings (after 4 of 9 races): (1) Reinfried Herbst  245 points (2) Lizeroux 241 (3) Silvan Zurbriggen  150
Women's World Cup in Haus im Ennstal, Austria:
Super-G:  Lindsey Vonn   Anja Paerson   Nadia Fanchini  & Martina Schild 
Overall standings (after 17 of 33 races): (1) Vonn 894 points (2) Maria Riesch  702 (3) Kathrin Zettel  569
Super-G standings (after 3 of 7 races): (1) Vonn 240 points (2) Nadia Styger  145 (3) Elisabeth Görgl  136

American football
NFL Wild Card Weekend (seeds in parentheses):
AFC: (6) Baltimore Ravens 33, (3) New England Patriots 14
The Patriots suffer their worst home playoff loss since  as Ray Rice begins the game with an 88-yard touchdown run and the Ravens score 24 first quarter points.
NFC: (4) Arizona Cardinals 51, (5) Green Bay Packers 45 (OT)
Karlos Dansby scores the Cardinals' winning touchdown on a 17-yard fumble return, after the Packers rally from a 21-point deficit to tie the score in regulation time. The game sets NFL playoff records for total points (96) and touchdowns (13). In a losing effort, Aaron Rodgers becomes the 12th quarterback in history to pass for 400 yards in a postseason game.

Biathlon
World Cup 4 in Oberhof, Germany:
12.5 km Mass Start Women:  Andrea Henkel  40:53.6 (2 penalty loops)  Helena Jonsson  41:17.0 (2)  Tora Berger  41:33.9 (2)
Overall standings (after 9 of 25 events): (1) Jonsson 450 points (2) Anna Carin Olofsson-Zidek  352 (3) Svetlana Sleptsova  337
15 km Mass Start Men:  Ole Einar Bjørndalen  38:57.3 (1 penalty loop)  Tim Burke  40:00.2 (2)  Tomasz Sikora  40:37.9 (3)
Bjørndalen wins his third event of the season from six starts.
Overall standings (after 9 of 25 events): (1) Burke 329 points (2) Evgeny Ustyugov  326 (3) Simon Fourcade  301

Bobsleigh
World Cup in Königssee, Germany:
Four-man:  André Lange, René Hoppe, Kevin Kuske, Martin Putze  1:37.07  Steven Holcomb, Justin Olsen, Steve Mesler, Curtis Tomasevicz  1:37.10  John Napier, Charles Berkeley, Steven Langton, Christopher Fogt  1:37.31
Standings (after 6 of 8 races): (1) Holcomb 1263 points (2) Jānis Miņins  1130 (3) Lyndon Rush  1057

Cricket
Tri-series in Bangladesh:
5th Match in Mirpur:
 213 (46.1 overs);  214/2 (32.4 overs). India win by 8 wickets.
Standings: Sri Lanka 12 points (4 matches), India 9 (3), Bangladesh 0 (3).
Sri Lanka and India advance to the final.

Cross-country skiing
Tour de Ski:
Stage 8 in Val di Fiemme, Italy:
Women's 9 km Freestyle Handicap, Final Climb:  Kristin Størmer Steira  35:49.8  Riitta-Liisa Roponen  35:52.8  Yevgeniya Medvedeva  35:53.7
Final Tour de Ski standings:  Justyna Kowalczyk 2:37:54.5   Petra Majdič  2:38:13.7  Arianna Follis  2:39:06.7
World Cup overall standings: (1)  Kowalczyk 1089 points (2) Majdič 1022 (3) Aino-Kaisa Saarinen  789
Men's 10 km Freestyle Handicap, Final Climb:  Lukáš Bauer  33:43.4  Marcus Hellner  33:45.8  Jean-Marc Gaillard  33:45.9
Final Tour de Ski standings:  Bauer 4:13:10.6  Petter Northug  4:14:27.0  Dario Cologna  4:14:42.8
World Cup overall standings: (1) Northug 1060 points (2) Bauer 663 (3) Hellner 627

Darts
BDO World Darts Championship in Frimley Green, England:
Men's final: Martin Adams  def. Dave Chisnall  7–5
Adams wins the title for the second time in four years.

Football (soccer)
African Cup of Nations in Angola:
Group A:  4–4 
Mali rally from 4-goal deficit with 12 minutes remaining and score two goals in injury time.

Freestyle skiing
World Cup in Calgary, Canada:
Men's aerials:  Jia Zongyang   Anton Kushnir   Alexei Grishin 
Standings after 3 of 6 events: (1) Kushnir 240 points (2) Jia 236 (3) Timofei Slivets  112
Women's aerials:  Li Nina   Evelyne Leu   Guo Xinxin 
Standings after 3 of 6 events: (1) Guo 240 points (2) Li 196 (3) Xu Mengtao  189

Golf
PGA Tour:
SBS Championship in Kapalua, Hawaii:
Winner: Geoff Ogilvy  270 (−22)
 Ogilvy wins the event for the second straight year, giving him seven PGA Tour wins in all.
European Tour:
Africa Open in East London, South Africa:
Winner: Charl Schwartzel  272 (−20)
Schwartzel wins his fourth European Tour title.

Luge
World Cup in Winterberg, Germany:
Women:  Natalie Geisenberger  1:53.179  Tatjana Hüfner  1:53.189  Erin Hamlin  1:53.329
Standings (after 6 of 8 races): (1) Hüfner 570 points (2) Geisenberger 540 (3) Anke Wischnewski  385
Teams:  Germany (Johannes Ludwig, Tatjana Hüfner, Tobias Wendl/Tobias Arlt) 2:25.827  Austria (Wolfgang Kindl, Nina Reithmayer, Andreas Linger/Wolfgang Linger) 2:26.392  United States (Bengt Walden, Erin Hamlin, Mark Grimmette/Brian Martin) 2:26.663
Standings (after 4 of 5 races): (1) Austria 310 points (2) Germany 300 (3) Canada 295

Nordic combined
World Cup in Val di Fiemme, Italy:
HS134 / 10 km:  Bill Demong  33:49.9  Todd Lodwick  34:05.2  Eric Frenzel  34:14.0
Standings (after 11 of 19 events): (1) Jason Lamy-Chappuis  709 points (2) Felix Gottwald  533 (3) Tino Edelmann  480

Short track speed skating
World Junior Championships in Taipei City, Chinese Taipei:
Men's final overall standings:  Noh Jinkyu  68 points  Antoine Gelinas-Beaulieu  63  Park Seyeong  47
Women's final overall standings:  Choi Jihyun  115 points  Lee Mi-Yeon  68  Song Jaewon  42

Skeleton
World Cup in Königssee, Germany:
Team:

Ski jumping
World Cup in Tauplitz-Bad Mitterndorf, Austria:
HS 200 (Ski flying):  Gregor Schlierenzauer  401.7 points (203.0m/205.0m)  Robert Kranjec  392.6 (198.5m/204.5m)  Harri Olli  388.0 (199.5m/200.5m)
World Cup standings (after 12 of 23 events): (1) Schlierenzauer 796 points (2) Simon Ammann  794 (3) Andreas Kofler  587

Snowboarding
World Cup in Bad Gastein, Austria:
Men's snowboard cross:  Nate Holland   Pierre Vaultiern   Mario Fuchs 
Standings after 4 of 7 events: (1) Vaultier 2800 points (2) Robert Fagan  1490 (3) Holland 1480
Women's snowboard cross:  Lindsey Jacobellis   Helene Olafsen   Sandra Frei 
Standings after 4 of 7 events: (1) Maëlle Ricker  2360 points (2) Jacobellis 1530 (3) Dominique Maltais  1460

Speed skating
European Championships in Hamar, Norway:
Men's overall standings:  Sven Kramer  150.227 points  Enrico Fabris  150.776  Ivan Skobrev  152.178
Kramer becomes the first ever skater to win the title four straight times.
Women's overall standings:  Martina Sáblíková  162.825 points  Ireen Wüst  164.204  Daniela Anschütz-Thoms  165.343
Sáblíková wins the title for the second time in four years.

Tennis
ATP World Tour:
Brisbane International in Brisbane, Australia:
Final: Andy Roddick  def. Radek Štěpánek  7–6(2), 7–6(7)
Roddick wins his 28th career title.
Chennai Open in Chennai, India:
Final: Marin Čilić  def. Stanislas Wawrinka   7–6(2), 7–6(3)
Čilić wins this tournaments for the second straight year, and his fourth title overall.

January 9, 2010 (Saturday)

Alpine skiing
Men's World Cup in Adelboden, Switzerland:
Giant slalom: Cancelled due bad weather.
Women's World Cup in Haus im Ennstal, Austria:
Downhill:  Lindsey Vonn   Nadja Kamer   Ingrid Jacquemod 
Overall standings (after 16 of 33 races): (1) Vonn 794 points (2) Maria Riesch  695 (3) Kathrin Zettel  569
Downhill standings (after 4 of 8 races): (1) Vonn 400 points (2) Riesch 236 (3) Anja Paerson  215

American football
NFL Wild Card Weekend (seeds in parentheses):
AFC: (5) New York Jets 24, (4) Cincinnati Bengals 14
The Bengals become the first victims of the postseason as Mark Sanchez goes 12 of 15 for 182 yards to secure the Jets' victory in a rematch of their "Win and in" game from Week 17.
NFC: (3) Dallas Cowboys 34, (6) Philadelphia Eagles 14
The Cowboys pick up their first playoff win since 1996, scoring on five straight second-quarter drives to defeat the Eagles for the second week in a row, and hand them their third loss to Dallas this season.

Biathlon
World Cup 4 in Oberhof, Germany:
10 km Sprint Men:  Evgeny Ustyugov  28:45.0 (0 penalties)  Michael Greis  28:47.8 (1)  Carl Johan Bergman  28:53.2 (0)
Overall standings after 8 of 25 events: (1) Ustyugov 283 points (2) Tim Burke  275 (3) Simon Fourcade  265
Sprint standings after 4 of 10 events: (1) Ole Einar Bjørndalen  147 points (2) Ustyugov 146 (3) Greis 143

Bobsleigh
World Cup in Königssee, Germany:
Two-man:  Thomas Florschütz/Richard Adjei  1:38.17  André Lange/Kevin Kuske  1:38.22  Beat Hefti/Thomas Lamparter  1:38.23
Standings (after 6 of 8 races): (1) Ivo Rüegg  1202 points (2) Florschütz 1115 (3) Karl Angerer  1090
Two-woman:  Cathleen Martini/Romy Logsch  1:41.04  Kaillie Humphries/Heather Moyse  1:41.33  Sandra Kiriasis/Christin Senkel  1:41.43
Standings (after 6 of 8 races): (1) Kiriasis 1222 (2) Humphries 1171 (3) Helen Upperton  1122

Cross-country skiing
Tour de Ski:
Stage 7 in Val di Fiemme, Italy:
Women's 10 km Classic Mass Start:  Petra Majdič  34:06.4  Elena Kolomina  34:06.5  Marianna Longa  34:07.4
Standings (after 7 of 8 stages): (1) Majdič 2:01:08.3 (2) Justyna Kowalczyk  2:01:39.7 (3) Arianna Follis  2:02:04.8
Men's 20 km Classic Mass Start:  Lukáš Bauer  59:03.5  Petter Northug  59:35.0  Axel Teichmann  59:35.8
Standings (after 7 of 8 stages): (1) Northug 3:39:18.9 (2) Bauer 3:39:27.2 (3) Teichmann (GER) 3:40:49.2

Football (soccer)
African Cup of Nations:
Togo withdraws from the tournament following the attack on the team bus yesterday, in which three people were killed and nine injured, including two players.

Freestyle skiing
World Cup in Calgary, Canada:
Men's moguls:  Dale Begg-Smith   Alexandre Bilodeau   Alexandr Smyshlyaev 
Standings (after 4 of 12 events): (1) Begg-Smith 295 points (2) Jesper Bjoernlund  281 (3) Bilodeau 205
Women's moguls:  Jennifer Heil   Aiko Uemura   Nicola Sudova 
Standings (after 4 of 12 events): (1) Heil 305 points (2) Kristi Richards  223 (3) Sudova 222
World Cup in Les Contamines, France:
Men's skicross:  Xavier Kuhn   Stanley Hayer   Tomas Krauz 
Standings (after 4 of 12 events): (1) Michael Schmid  295 points (2) Kuhn 225 (3) Audun Groenvold  180
Women's skicross:  Ashleigh McIvor   Julia Murray   Karin Huttary 
Standings (after 4 of 12 events): (1) Ophélie David  290 points (2) McIvor 247 (3) Murray 203

Luge
World Cup in Winterberg, Germany:
Doubles:  Christian Oberstolz/Patrick Gruber  1:28.597  Gerhard Plankensteiner/Oswald Haselrieder  1:28.805  Patric Leitner/Alexander Resch  1:28.990
Standings (after 6 of 8 races): (1) André Florschütz/Torsten Wustlich  442 points (2) Oberstolz/Gruber 440 (3) Leitner/Resch 430
Men:  Armin Zöggeler  1:47.601  Albert Demtschenko  1:47.621  David Möller  1:47.652
Standings (after 6 of 8 races): (1) Zöggeler 555 points (2) Demtschenko 464 (3) Möller 381

Nordic combined
World Cup in Val di Fiemme, Italy:
HS134 / 10 km:  Felix Gottwald  24:44.5  Magnus Moan  24:45.3  Eric Frenzel  24:46.5
Standings (after 10 of 19 events): (1) Jason Lamy-Chappuis  673 points (2) Gottwald 483 (3) Tino Edelmann  480

Ski jumping
World Cup in Tauplitz-Bad Mitterndorf, Austria:
HS 200 (Ski flying):  Robert Kranjec  382.5 points (195.0m/200.0m)  Simon Ammann  382.0 (195.0m/200.0m)  Martin Koch  270.2 (192.0m/201.5m)
World Cup standings (after 11 of 23 events): (1) Ammann 749 points (2) Gregor Schlierenzauer  696 (3) Andreas Kofler  561

Tennis
ATP World Tour:
Qatar ExxonMobil Open in Doha, Qatar:
Final: Nikolay Davydenko  def. Rafael Nadal  0–6, 7–6(8), 6–4
Davydenko wins his 20th career title.
WTA Tour:
Brisbane International in Brisbane, Australia:
Final: Kim Clijsters  def. Justine Henin  6–3, 4–6, 7–6(6)
Clijsters wins her 36th career title and denies Henin a win on her first tournament since May 2008.
ASB Classic in Auckland, New Zealand:
Final: Yanina Wickmayer  def. Flavia Pennetta  6–3, 6–2
Wickmayer wins her third career WTA Tour title.
Hopman Cup in Perth, Australia:
Final: Spain def. Great Britain 2–1
Laura Robson  def. María José Martínez Sánchez  6–1, 7–6(2)
Tommy Robredo  def. Andy Murray  1–6, 6–4, 6–3
Martínez Sánchez/Robredo  def. Robson/Murray  7–6(6), 7–5
Spain win the title for the third time.
Exhibition tournaments:
Hong Kong Tennis Classic in Causeway Bay, Hong Kong:
Final: Team Russia def. Team Europe 2–1
Yevgeny Kafelnikov  def. Stefan Edberg  7–5, 6–4
Maria Sharapova  def. Caroline Wozniacki  7–5, 6–3
Wozniacki/Edberg  def. Vera Zvonareva/Kafelnikov  6–4, 6–3

January 8, 2010 (Friday)

Alpine skiing
Women's World Cup in Haus im Ennstal, Austria:
Downhill:  Lindsey Vonn   Anja Paerson   Maria Riesch 
Overall standings (after 15 of 33 races): (1) Vonn 694 points (2) Riesch 659 (3) Kathrin Zettel  569
Downhill standings (after 3 of 8 races): (1) Vonn 300 points (2) Riesch 200 (3) Paerson 170

Biathlon
World Cup 4 in Oberhof, Germany:
7.5 km Sprint Women:  Simone Hauswald  22:15.1 (0 penalties)  Helena Jonsson  22:23.8 (1)  Ann Kristin Flatland  22:32.6 (0)
Overall standings after 8 of 25 events: (1) Jonsson 396 points (2) Anna Carin Olofsson-Zidek  323 (3) Svetlana Sleptsova  312
Sprint standings after 4 of 10 events: (1) Jonsson 180 points (2) Kati Wilhelm  157 (3) Sleptsova 155

Cricket
Tri-series in Bangladesh:
4th Match in Mirpur:
 249/9 (50 overs);  252/1 (42.5 overs, Upul Tharanga 118*, Mahela Jayawardene 108). Sri Lanka win by 9 wickets.
Standings: Sri Lanka 12 points (3 matches), India 4 (2), Bangladesh 0 (3).
Sri Lanka advance to the final.

Darts
BDO World Darts Championship in Frimley Green, England:
Women's final: Trina Gulliver  def. Rhian Edwards  2–0
Gulliver wins the title for the eighth time.

Freestyle skiing
World Cup in Calgary, Canada:
Men's moguls:  Dale Begg-Smith   Vincent Marquis   Alexandr Smyshlyaev 
Standings (after 3 of 12 events): (1) Jesper Bjoernlund  245 points (2) Begg-Smith 195 (3) Bryon Wilson  160
Women's moguls:  Jennifer Heil   Nicola Sudova   Margarita Marbler 
Standings (after 3 of 12 events): (1) Kristi Richards  220 points (2) Heil 205 (3) Hannah Kearney  184

Skeleton
World Cup in Königssee, Germany:
Men:  Martins Dukurs  1:35.29  Sandro Stielicke  1:35.63  Frank Rommel  1:35.84
Standings after 6 of 8 events: (1) Dukurs 1269 points (2) Rommel 1211 (3) Stielicke 1102
Women:  Mellisa Hollingsworth  1:38.26  Kerstin Szymkowiak  1:38.50  Shelley Rudman  1:38.73
Standings after 6 of 8 events: (1) Hollingsworth 1236 points (2) Rudman 1187 (3) Szymkowiak 1164

January 7, 2010 (Thursday)

American football
NCAA bowl games:
2010 Citi BCS National Championship Game in Pasadena, California:
(1) Alabama 37, (2) Texas 21
The Crimson Tide are declared unanimous national champions since they also topped the Associated Press season-ending poll. Mark Ingram II, who rushes for 116 yards and two touchdowns, becomes the fifth player in history to win the Heisman Trophy and national championship in the same season. Nick Saban becomes the only coach since 1936 to win national championships with two different schools.

Basketball
Euroleague Regular Season Game 9: (teams in bold advance to the Top-16 stage, teams in strike are eliminated)
Group A:
Žalgiris Kaunas  68–61  Cibona Zagreb
ASVEL Villeurbanne  64–90  Regal FC Barcelona
Standings: Regal FC Barcelona 9–0, Montepaschi Siena 8–1, ASVEL Villeurbanne, Fenerbahçe Ülker 3–6, Cibona Zagreb, Žalgiris Kaunas 2–7.
Group B:
Efes Pilsen Istanbul   85–93 (OT)  Olympiacos Piraeus
Unicaja Málaga   72–88  Entente Orléans Loiret
Standings: Olympiacos Piraeus 7–2, Unicaja Málaga 6–3, Partizan Belgrade 5–4, Lietuvos Rytas Vilnius 4–5, Efes Pilsen Istanbul 3–6, Entente Orléans Loiret 2–7.
Group C:
Maccabi Tel Aviv  79–59  Lottomatica Roma
Union Olimpija Ljubljana  77–80 (OT)   CSKA Moscow
Standings: CSKA Moscow, Caja Laboral Baskonia 7–2, Maccabi Tel Aviv 6–3, Maroussi Athens, Lottomatica Roma 3–6, Union Olimpija Ljubljana 1–8.
Group D:
Khimki Moscow Region  79–63  Armani Jeans Milano
Standings: Real Madrid, Panathinaikos Athens 7–2, Khimki Moscow Region 6–3, Armani Jeans Milano, Asseco Prokom Gdynia 3–6, EWE Baskets Oldenburg 1–8.

Biathlon
World Cup 4 in Oberhof, Germany:
4 x 7.5 km Relay Men:  Norway (Halvard Hanevold, Tarjei Bø, Emil Hegle Svendsen, Ole Einar Bjørndalen) 1:17:03.3 (0 penalty loops+7 extra bullets)  France (Vincent Jay, Vincent Defrasne, Simon Fourcade, Martin Fourcade) 1:17:30.8 (0+7)  Germany (Christoph Stephan, Michael Greis, Arnd Peiffer, Simon Schempp) 1:17:45.5 (0+9)
Standings after 3 of 5 races: (1) France 157 points (2) Norway 154 (3) Austria 151

Cricket
England in South Africa:
3rd Test in Cape Town, day 5:
 291 and 447/7d;  273 and 296/9. Match drawn, England lead the 4-match series 1–0.
Tri-series in Bangladesh:
3rd Match in Mirpur:
 296/6 (50 ov);  297/4 (47.3 ov, MS Dhoni 101*). India win by 6 wickets.
Standings: Sri Lanka 8 points, India 4, Bangladesh 0.

Cross-country skiing
Tour de Ski:
Stage 6 in Toblach, Italy:
Women's 5 km Classic:  Justyna Kowalczyk  12:37.6  Aino-Kaisa Saarinen  12:49.2  Petra Majdič  12:52.4
Standings (after 6 of 8 stages): (1) Kowalczyk 1:27:32.8 (2) Majdič 1:27:46.9 (3) Arianna Follis  1:27:56.0
Men's 10 km Classic:  Daniel Rickardsson  23:14.5  Lukáš Bauer  23:16.2  Petter Northug  23:20.7
Standings (after 6 of 8 stages): (1) Northug 2:40:48.9 (2) Marcus Hellner  2:41:09.0 (3) Axel Teichmann  2:41:18.4

Snowboarding
World Cup in Kreischberg, Austria:
Men's half-pipe:  Daisuke Murakami   Patrick Burgener   Tore Viken Holvik 
Standings after 3 of 6 events: (1) Kazuhiro Kokubo  1600 points (2) Kohei Kudo  1140 (3) Murakami 1110
Women's half-pipe:  Šárka Pančochová   Sun Zhifeng   Chen Xu 
Standings after 3 of 6 events: (1)  Cai Xuetong  1240 (2) Pancochova 1100 (3) Sophie Rodriguez  1050

January 6, 2010 (Wednesday)

Alpine skiing
Men's World Cup in Zagreb, Croatia:
Slalom:  Giuliano Razzoli   Manfred Mölgg   Julien Lizeroux 
Overall standings (after 16 of 34 races): (1) Benjamin Raich  589 points (2) Carlo Janka  575 (3) Didier Cuche  476
Slalom standings (after 3 of 9 races): (1) Reinfried Herbst  245 points (2) Lizeroux 141 (3) Razzoli 140

American football
NCAA bowl games:
GMAC Bowl in Mobile, Alabama:
Central Michigan 44, Troy 41 (2 OT)
NFL news:
The Washington Redskins name Mike Shanahan, former Super Bowl winning coach of the Denver Broncos, as their new head coach, signing a five-year contract.

Baseball
MLB news:
Andre Dawson is elected to the Hall of Fame. For the first time in history, two players fall less than 10 votes short of induction in the same election—Bert Blyleven, 5 votes short, and Roberto Alomar, 8 votes short. Alomar also receives the highest percentage of votes ever for a first-time candidate who was not elected to the Hall.

Basketball
Euroleague Regular Season Game 9: (teams in bold advance to the Top-16 stage, teams in strike are eliminated)
Group A:
Montepaschi Siena  101–58  Fenerbahçe Ülker Istanbul
Group B:
Partizan Belgrade  97–67  Lietuvos Rytas Vilnius
Group C:
Caja Laboral Baskonia   73–65  Maroussi Athens
Group D:
Panathinaikos Athens   74–66  Asseco Prokom Gdynia
Real Madrid  73–60  EWE Baskets Oldenburg

Biathlon
World Cup 4 in Oberhof, Germany:
4 x 6 km Relay Women:  Russia (Anna Bogaliy-Titovets, Anna Boulygina, Olga Medvedtseva, Svetlana Sleptsova) 1:14:23.6 (0 penalty, 8 reloads)  Germany (Martina Beck, Simone Hauswald, Tina Bachmann, Andrea Henkel) 1:14:23.9 (0, 11)  France (Marie-Laure Brunet, Sylvie Becaert, Marie Dorin, Sandrine Bailly) 1:15:24.5 (0, 8)
Standings (after 3 of 5 events): (1) Russia 174 points (2) Germany 157 (3) France 150

Cricket
England in South Africa:
3rd Test in Cape Town, day 4:
 291 and 447/7d (Graeme Smith 183);  273 and 132/3 (51.0 ov). England need another 334 runs with 7 wickets remaining.
Pakistan in Australia:
2nd Test in Sydney, day 4:
 127 and 381 (Michael Hussey 134*);  333 and 139 (Nathan Hauritz 5–53). Australia win by 36 runs, lead the 3-match series 2–0.
Australia win their 11th successive Test against Pakistan and secure the series win, as they become the sixth team in history to win a Test after trailing by more than 200 runs on the first innings.

Cross-country skiing
Tour de Ski:
Stage 5 from Cortina d'Ampezzo to Toblach, Italy:
Women's 16 km Freestyle Handicap start:  Arianna Follis  34:34.8  Petra Majdič  + 3.4  Justyna Kowalczyk  + 4.1
Standings (after 5 of 8 stages): (1) Follis 1:14:51.1 (2) Majdič + 0.4 (3) Kowalczyk + 4.1
Men's 36 km Freestyle Handicap start:  Petter Northug  1:25:38.0  Dario Cologna  + 0.4  Marcus Hellner  + 0.8
Standings (after 5 of 8 stages): (1) Northug 2:17:28.2 (2) Cologna + 0.4 (3) Hellner + 1.2

Football (soccer)
2011 Asian Cup qualification, matchday 5: (teams in bold qualify for the final tournament)
Group A:
 2–3 
 4–0 
Standings: Bahrain 12 points (4 matches), Japan 12 (5), Yemen 3 (4), Hong Kong 0 (5).
Group B:
 1–2 
 2–2 
Standings: Kuwait, Australia 8 points, Oman 7, Indonesia 3.
Group C:
 1–0 
Standings: Uzbekistan 9 points (3 matches), UAE 6 (3), Malaysia 0 (4).
Group D:
 0–0 
 1–1 
Standings: Syria 11 points, China 10, Vietnam 5, Lebanon 1.
Group E:
 1–3 
 0–0 
Standings: Iran 10 points, Thailand, Singapore 6, Jordan 5.

Ski jumping
Four Hills Tournament:
World Cup in Bischofshofen, Austria:
HS 140:  Thomas Morgenstern  264.7 points (133.0m/136.0m)  Janne Ahonen  264.0 (134.0m/133.5m)  Simon Ammann  261.5 (136.0m/131.5m)
Four Hills Tournament final standings:  Andreas Kofler  1027.2 points  Gregor Schlierenzauer  1013.9  Wolfgang Loitzl  1011.6
World Cup standings (after 10 of 23 events): (1) Ammann 669 points (2) Schlierenzauer 651 (3) Kofler 521

Snowboarding
World Cup in Kreischberg, Austria:
Men's parallel giant slalom:  Jasey Jay Anderson   Andreas Prommegger    Benjamin Karl 
Standings (after 4 of 9 events): (1) Anderson 3050 points (2) Karl 2660 (3) Mathieu Bozzetto  1700
Women's parallel giant slalom:  Nicolien Sauerbreij   Alexa Loo   Fraenzi Maegert-Kohli 
Standings (after 4 of 9 events): (1) Amelie Kober  2180 (2) Doris Guenther  1990 (3) Maegert-Kohli 1920

January 5, 2010 (Tuesday)

American football
NCAA bowl games:
FedEx Orange Bowl in Miami Gardens, Florida:
(10) Iowa 24, (9) Georgia Tech 14

Cricket
England in South Africa:
3rd Test in Cape Town, day 3:
 291 & 312/2 (80.0 ov, Graeme Smith 162*);  273 (Morné Morkel 5–75). South Africa lead by 330 runs with 8 wickets remaining.
Smith scores his 19th Test century and becomes the second captain in history to score 6000 Test runs.
Pakistan in Australia:
2nd Test in Sydney, day 3:
 127 and 286/8;  333. Australia lead by 80 runs with 2 wickets remaining.
Tri-series in Bangladesh:
2nd Match in Mirpur:
 279/9 (50 ov, Chanaka Welegedara 5–66);  283/5 (48 ov, Thilan Samaraweera 105*). Sri Lanka win by 5 wickets.
Standings: Sri Lanka 8 points (2 matches), India, Bangladesh 0 (1).

Freestyle skiing
World Cup in St. Johann in Tirol/Oberndorf, Austria:
Men's skicross:  Simon Stickl   Daron Rahlves   David Duncan 
Standings (after 3 of 12 events): (1) Michael Schmid  250 points (2) Audun Groenvold  166 (3) Stickl 140
Women's skicross:  Ophélie David   Méryll Boulangeat   Julia Murray 
Standings (after 3 of 12 events): (1) David 240 points (2) Anna Holmlund  200 (3) Ashleigh McIvor  147

Ice hockey
World Junior Championships in Saskatoon, Saskatchewan, Canada:
Gold medal game:   5–6 (OT)  
John Carlson scores 4:31 minutes into overtime to give the title to USA for the second time and stop Canada's championships streak at five and their winning streak at 15. Jordan Eberle, who scores twice in the last 3 minutes of regulation time to send the game to overtime, is named the MVP of the championships.
Bronze medal game:  4–11  
The Tre Kronor score the most goals in a bronze medal game in championships history.

January 4, 2010 (Monday)

American football
NCAA bowl games:
Tostitos Fiesta Bowl in Glendale, Arizona:
(6) Boise State 17, (4) TCU 10
The Broncos win the first ever BCS bowl game other than the National Championship Game between two unbeaten teams, at the same site of the game that put them on the national map, and finish unbeaten for the second time in four seasons.
NFL news:
The Washington Redskins, who ended the 2009 season at 4–12, fire head coach Jim Zorn and his entire staff.
The Buffalo Bills relieve interim coach Perry Fewell and his staff of their duties; Fewell will apply to become permanent head coach after filling in following Dick Jauron's sacking in November.

Cricket
England in South Africa:
3rd Test in Cape Town, day 2:
 291 (Jacques Kallis 108, James Anderson 5–63);  241/7 (82.0 ov). England trail by 50 runs with 3 wickets remaining in the 1st innings.
Pakistan in Australia:
2nd Test in Sydney, day 2:
 127;  331/9 (96.0 ov). Pakistan lead by 204 runs with 1 wicket remaining in the 1st innings.
Tri-series in Bangladesh:
1st Match in Mirpur:
 260/7 (50 ov);  261/3 (44.5 ov, Tillakaratne Dilshan 104). Sri Lanka win by 7 wickets.

Cross-country skiing
Tour de Ski:
Stage 4 in Prague, Czech Republic:
Women's Sprint Freestyle:  Natalya Korostelyova  2:45.7  Celine Brun-Lie  + 0.9  Alena Procházková  + 2.2
Standings (after 4 of 8 stages): (1) Aino-Kaisa Saarinen  40:16.3 (2) Justyna Kowalczyk  + 24.9 (3) Petra Majdič  + 29.7
Men's Sprint Freestyle:  Emil Jönsson  2:26.5  Marcus Hellner  + 1.4  Simen Østensen  + 3.0
Standings (after 4 of 8 stages): (1) Jönsson 51:50.2 (2) Hellner + 43.8 (3) Østensen + 44.3

Ice hockey
World Junior Championships in Saskatoon, Saskatchewan, Canada:
Relegation round:
 2–5 
 6–4 
Final standings: Czech Republic 9 points, Slovakia 6, Latvia 3, Austria 0.
5th place:  3–4

Tennis
WTA Tour:
Brisbane International in Brisbane, Australia:
Justin Henin  makes a comeback to the Tour after 20-months retirement and defeats #2 seed Nadia Petrova  7–5, 7–5.

January 3, 2010 (Sunday)

Alpine skiing
Women's World Cup in Zagreb, Croatia:
Slalom:  Sandrine Aubert   Kathrin Zettel   Susanne Riesch 
Overall standings (after 14 of 33 races): (1) Maria Riesch  599 points (2) Lindsey Vonn  594 (3) Zettel 569
Slalom standings (after 5 of 8 races): (1)  Aubert 316 points (2) Maria Riesch 293 (3) Šárka Záhrobská  253

American football
NFL Week 17 – end of regular season (division champions in bold, teams that earned a first-round bye in bold italics, teams that earned wild card berths in italics):
Buffalo Bills 30, Indianapolis Colts 7
The Colts lose their second straight game, but still end the season with a league-best 14–2 record.
Cleveland Browns 23, Jacksonville Jaguars 17
The Jags lose their fourth straight game and miss the playoffs.
Minnesota Vikings 44, New York Giants 7
The Vikings earn a first-round bye in the NFC playoffs.
Atlanta Falcons 20, Tampa Bay Buccaneers 10
Houston Texans 34, New England Patriots 27
The Texans, who rally from 14 points down in the fourth quarter, are eliminated from the playoffs on a tiebreaker because the Ravens and Jets both win.
Carolina Panthers 23, New Orleans Saints 10
The Saints end the season with three straight losses after a 13–0 start.
Chicago Bears 37, Detroit Lions 23
San Francisco 49ers 28, St. Louis Rams 6
The Rams suffer their eighth straight loss and end the season with a league-worst 1–15 record, that earn them the top selection at the Draft. They would also become the 9th team to finish a season at 1-15.
Pittsburgh Steelers 30, Miami Dolphins 24
The Steelers are eliminated from the playoff on a tiebreaker despite their win, thus the 2003–2004 New England Patriots remain the last repeat Super Bowl champions, while the Dolphins, the host team for Super Bowl XLIV, are also eliminated from the postseason with their third straight loss.
Green Bay Packers 33, Arizona Cardinals 7
The teams will meet again in the Wild Card Round at Arizona on January 10.
Baltimore Ravens 21, Oakland Raiders 13
The Ravens claim an AFC wild card berth with this win, and will meet the New England Patriots in the Wild Card Round at Foxboro on January 10.
Dallas Cowboys 24, Philadelphia Eagles 0
The Cowboys clinch the NFC East title, and earn home field advantage in a rematch against the Eagles in the Wild Card Round on January 9.
San Diego Chargers 23, Washington Redskins 20
The Chargers extend their winning streak to 11 games.
Tennessee Titans 17, Seattle Seahawks 13
Chris Johnson breaks Marshall Faulk's record for total yards from scrimmage and becomes the sixth player to rush for 2,000 yards in a season.
Kansas City Chiefs 44, Denver Broncos 24
Despite the Broncos' Kyle Orton becoming the sixth quarterback this season to pass for 400 yards in a game, they are eliminated from the playoffs with this loss.
Sunday Night Football: New York Jets 37, Cincinnati Bengals 0
A crushing win in the last regular-season game at Giants Stadium gives the Jets an AFC wild card berth and a rematch with the Bengals in Cincinnati on January 9.

Cricket
England in South Africa:
3rd Test in Cape Town, day 1:
 279/6 (83.2 ov, Jacques Kallis 108*)
Kallis scores his 33rd Test century and the seventh in 28 matches against England.
Pakistan in Australia:
2nd Test in Sydney, day 1:
 127 (44.2 ov, Mohammad Asif 6/41);  14/0. Pakistan trail by 113 runs with 10 wickets remaining in the first innings.
Asif claims a career-best six-wicket haul as Australia score their worst innings total at home in 13 years.

Cross-country skiing
Tour de Ski:
Stage 3 in Oberhof, Germany:
Women's Sprint Classic:  Petra Majdič  4:18.8  Justyna Kowalczyk  + 2.1  Aino-Kaisa Saarinen  + 3.6
Standings (after 3 of 8 stages): (1) Kowalczyk 37:56.1 (2) Saarinen 38:00.4 (3) Kristin Størmer Steira  38:26.2
Men's Sprint Classic:  Eldar Rønning  3:55.0  Petter Northug  + 2.1  Axel Teichmann  + 3.1
Standings (after 3 of 8 stages): (1) Northug 49:58.0 (2) Teichmann 50:07.8 (3) Emil Jönsson  50.18.9

Darts
PDC World Darts Championship in London, England:
Final: Phil Taylor  def. Simon Whitlock  7–3
Taylor wins the title for the 13th time, in its 17th edition.

Football (soccer)
 FA Cup Third Round:
In one of the biggest upsets in the Cup's history, Manchester United lose 0–1 at home to Leeds United of Football League One.

Ice hockey
World Junior Championships in Saskatoon, Saskatchewan, Canada:
Semifinals:
 6–1 
Canada advance to the final for the ninth straight time, and extend their winning streak to 15 games.
 2–5 
USA reach the final for the third time in history and the first since 2004. Both previous finals were also against Canada.
Relegation round:
 10–2 
Standings (after 2 games): Czech Republic, Slovakia 6 points, Austria, Latvia 0.

Luge
World Cup in Königssee, Germany:
Men:  Albert Demtschenko  1:34.176  Armin Zöggeler  1:34.549  David Möller  1:34.640
Standings (after 5 of 8 races): (1) Zöggeler 455 points (2) Demtschenko 379 (3) Felix Loch  329
Teams:  Germany (Felix Loch, Tatjana Hüfner, Tobias Wendl/Tobias Arlt) 2:38.302  Austria (Daniel Pfister, Nina Reithmayer, Andreas Linger/Wolfgang Linger) 2:38.951  Canada (Samuel Edney, Alex Gough, Chris Moffat/Mike Moffat) 2:39.077
Standings (after 3 of 5 races): (1) Canada 240 points (2) Austria 225 (3) Germany 200

Nordic combined
World Cup in Oberhof, Germany:
HS140 / 10 km:  Johnny Spillane  28:13.3  Felix Gottwald  28:44.1  Björn Kircheisen  28:52.4
Standings (after 9 of 19 events): (1) Jason Lamy-Chappuis  647 points (2) Tino Edelmann  462 (3) Gottwald 383

Ski jumping
Four Hills Tournament:
World Cup in Innsbruck, Austria:
HS 130:  Gregor Schlierenzauer  251.1 points (130.0m/122.0m)  Simon Ammann  237.8 (128.5m/117.5m)  Janne Ahonen  237.4 (128.0m/117.5m)
Four Hills Tournament standings (after 3 of 4 events): (1) Andreas Kofler  772.2 points (2) Schlierenzauer 757.6 (3) Wolfgang Loitzl  750.7
World Cup standings (after 9 of 23 events): (1) Schlierenzauer 611 points (2) Ammann 609 (3) Kofler 476

January 2, 2010 (Saturday)

American football
NCAA bowl games:
International Bowl in Toronto, Canada:
South Florida 27, Northern Illinois 3
PapaJohns.com Bowl in Birmingham, Alabama:
UConn 20, South Carolina 7
AT&T Cotton Bowl Classic in Arlington, Texas:
Ole Miss 21, (19) Oklahoma State 7
AutoZone Liberty Bowl in Memphis, Tennessee:
Arkansas 20, East Carolina 17 (OT)
Alex Tejada's 37-yard field goal in overtime wins the game for the Razorbacks, after the Pirates' kicker Ben Hartman misses two FG attempts in the last minute of regulation time and another one in OT.
Valero Energy Alamo Bowl in San Antonio, Texas:
Texas Tech 41, Michigan State 31

Cross-country skiing
Tour de Ski:
Stage 2 in Oberhof, Germany:
Women's 10 km Classic Handicap start:  Justyna Kowalczyk  28:10.0  Aino-Kaisa Saarinen  + 2.8  Kristin Størmer Steira  + 5.7
Standings (after 2 of 8 stages): (1) Kowalczyk 34:30.0 (2) Saarinen 34:32.8 (3) Størmer Steira 34:35.7
Men's 15 km Classic Handicap start:  Petter Northug  39:45.8  Maxim Vylegzhanin  + 0.1  Matti Heikkinen  + 0.7
Standings (after 2 of 8 stages): (1) Northug 47:07.8 (2) Vylegzhanin 47:07.9 (3) Heikkinen 47:08.6

Ice hockey
World Junior Championships in Saskatoon, Saskatchewan, Canada:
Quarterfinals:
 2–3 (OT) 
Nino Niederreiter's goal with 32 seconds remaining in the third period sends the game to overtime, and his second goal with 14 seconds left in the extra period wins the game for  the Swiss.
 6–2 
Relegation round:
 3–2 
Standings: Slovakia 6 points (2 games), Czech Republic 3 (1), Latvia 0 (1), Austria 0 (2).

Luge
World Cup in Königssee, Germany:
Women:  Tatjana Hüfner  1:35.324  Natalie Geisenberger  1:35.550  Steffi Sieger  1:35.867
Standings (after 5 of 8 races): (1) Hüfner 485 points (2) Geisenberger 440 (3) Anke Wischnewski  325
Doubles:  Tobias Wendl/Tobias Arlt  1:34.496  André Florschütz/Torsten Wustlich  1:34.584  Andreas Linger/Wolfgang Linger  1:34.590
Standings (after 5 of 8 races): (1) Florschütz/Wustlich 410 points (2) Linger/Linger & Patric Leitner/Alexander Resch  360

Nordic combined
World Cup in Oberhof, Germany:
HS140 / 10 km:  Hannu Manninen   Felix Gottwald   Jason Lamy Chappuis 
Standings (after 8 of 19 events): (1) Lamy-Chappuis 597 points (2) Tino Edelmann  440 (3) Gottwald 303

Tennis
Capitala World Tennis Championship in Abu Dhabi, United Arab Emirates:
Final: Rafael Nadal  def. Robin Söderling  7–6 (3), 7–5

January 1, 2010 (Friday)

American football
NCAA bowl games:
BCS games:
Rose Bowl Game presented by citi in Pasadena, California:
(8) Ohio State 26, (7) Oregon 17
Allstate Sugar Bowl in New Orleans:
(5) Florida 51, (3) Cincinnati 24
2007 Heisman Trophy winner Tim Tebow throws for 533 yards and 4 touchdowns in his final college game, as the Bearcats suffer their first loss this season.
Non-BCS games:
Outback Bowl in Tampa, Florida:
Auburn 38, Northwestern 35 (OT)
Konica Minolta Gator Bowl in Jacksonville, Florida:
Florida State 33, (16) West Virginia 21
 Retiring Seminoles head coach Bobby Bowden exits with a win against the school he coached before coming to Tallahassee in 1976.
Capital One Bowl in Orlando, Florida:
(13) Penn State 19, (12) LSU 17
A 21-yard field goal by kicker Collin Wagner with 57 seconds left in the game gives the Nittany Lions their 11th win of the season, after the Tigers rally from 13-point deficit to take a 17–16 lead.

Cross-country skiing
Tour de Ski:
Stage 1 in Oberhof, Germany:
Women's 2.5 km Freestyle:  Petra Majdič  6:35.3  Natalya Korostelyova  6:37.4  Justyna Kowalczyk  6:41.6
Men's 3.75 km Freestyle:  Petter Northug  7:37.4  Marcus Hellner  7:38.2  Axel Teichmann  7:39.4

Football (soccer)
 Emperor's Cup Final in Tokyo:
Gamba Osaka 4–1 Nagoya Grampus
Gamba Osaka win the Cup for the second successive time and third overall.

Ski jumping
Four Hills Tournament:
World Cup in Garmisch-Partenkirchen, Germany:
HS 140:  Gregor Schlierenzauer  277.7 points (136.5m/137.5m)  Wolfgang Loitzl  272.5 (135.0m/135.0m)  Simon Ammann  272.4 (132.0m/143.5 hill record)
Four Hills Tournament standings (after 2 of 4 events): (1) Andreas Kofler  537.1 points (2) Loitzl 517.9 (3) Janne Ahonen  512.5
World Cup standings (after 8 of 23 events): (1) Ammann 529 points (2) Schlierenzauer 511 (3) Kofler 426

References

I